

1–100 

|-
| 1 Ceres || – || Ceres, Roman goddess of agriculture, grain crops, fertility and motherly relationships || 
|-id=002
| 2 Pallas || – || Athena (Pallas), Greek goddess of wisdom, handicraft, and warfare || 
|-id=003
| 3 Juno || – || Juno, Roman goddess of marriage and childbirth || 
|-id=004
| 4 Vesta || – || Vesta, Roman goddess of the hearth, home, and family || 
|-id=005
| 5 Astraea || – || Astraea, Greek virgin goddess of justice, innocence, purity and precision || 
|-id=006
| 6 Hebe || – || Hebe, Greek goddess of eternal youth, prime of life, and forgiveness. Cupbearer to the gods. || 
|-id=007
| 7 Iris || – || Iris, Greek goddess of the rainbow and messenger of the gods || 
|-id=008
| 8 Flora || – || Flora, Roman goddess of flowers, gardens and spring || 
|-id=009
| 9 Metis || – || Metis, an Oceanid from Greek mythology, one of the many daughters of the Titans Oceanus and Tethys. || 
|-id=010
| 10 Hygiea || – || Hygieia, Greek goddess of health, one of the daughters of Asclepius, god of medicine || 
|-id=011
| 11 Parthenope || – || Parthenope, one of the Sirens in Greek mythology || 
|-id=012
| 12 Victoria || – || Victoria, Roman goddess of victory, daughter of Pallas and Styx || 
|-id=013
| 13 Egeria || – || Egeria, minor Roman goddess and nymph, wife of Numa Pompilius, second king of Rome || 
|-id=014
| 14 Irene || – || Eirene, Greek goddess of peace, daughter of Zeus and Themis || 
|-id=015
| 15 Eunomia || – || Eunomia, minor Greek goddess of law and legislation, daughter of Zeus and Themis || 
|-id=016
| 16 Psyche || – || Psyche, Greek nymph and wife of Cupid, god of erotic love and affection || 
|-id=017
| 17 Thetis || – || Thetis, a Nereid (sea nymph) from Greek mythology, one of the 50 daughters of Nereus and Doris. She is the mother of Achilles. || 
|-id=018
| 18 Melpomene || – || Melpomene, the Muse of tragedy in Greek mythology. The nine Muses are the inspirational goddesses of literature, science, and the arts. They are the daughters of Zeus and Mnemosyne. || 
|-id=019
| 19 Fortuna || – || Fortuna, Roman goddess of chance, luck and fate || 
|-id=020
| 20 Massalia || – || The city of Marseilles (by its Latin name) in south-western France || 
|-id=021
| 21 Lutetia || – || The city of Paris, capital of France, named by its Latin name, Lutetia.  || 
|-id=022
| 22 Kalliope || – || Calliope, the Muse of epic, heroic poetry in Greek mythology. The nine Muses are the inspirational goddesses of literature, science, and the arts. They are the daughters of Zeus and Mnemosyne. || 
|-id=023
| 23 Thalia || – || Thalia, the Muse of comedy in Greek mythology. The nine Muses are the inspirational goddesses of literature, science, and the arts. They are the daughters of Zeus and Mnemosyne. || 
|-id=024
| 24 Themis || – || Themis, goddess of law in Greek mythology. She is one of the 12 first-generation Titans, the children of Uranus (Father Sky) and Gaea (Mother Earth). || 
|-id=025
| 25 Phocaea || – || The ancient city of Phocaea, located on the western coast of Anatolia (Asia minor). The Greek settlers from Phocaea founded the colony of modern-day Marseille, France, where this asteroid was discovered at the Marseilles Observatory. || 
|-id=026
| 26 Proserpina || – || Proserpina, Roman goddess of fertility, wine, agriculture. She is the daughter of Ceres and Jupiter, and was abducted by Pluto into the underworld. || 
|-id=027
| 27 Euterpe || – || Euterpe, the Muse of music and lyric poetry in Greek mythology. The nine Muses are the inspirational goddesses of literature, science, and the arts. They are the daughters of Zeus and Mnemosyne. || 
|-id=028
| 28 Bellona || – || Bellona, Roman goddess of war. The daughter of Jupiter and Juno is the consort and sister of Mars. || 
|-id=029
| 29 Amphitrite || – || Amphitrite, sea goddess and wife of Poseidon in Greek mythology. The queen of the sea is either an Oceanid, one of the many daughters of the Titans Oceanus and Tethys or a Nereid (a daughters of the Nereus and Doris). || 
|-id=030
| 30 Urania || – || Urania, the Muse of astronomy in Greek mythology. The nine Muses are the inspirational goddesses of literature, science, and the arts. They are the daughters of Zeus and Mnemosyne. || 
|-id=031
| 31 Euphrosyne || – || Euphrosyne, one of the three Charites (Graces) in Greek mythology. Charites are the daughters of Zeus and Eurynome, an Oceanid (sea nymph). Her other two sisters are Thalia and Aglaea (Aglaja). || 
|-id=032
| 32 Pomona || – || Pomona, Roman goddess of fruit trees, gardens, and orchards. She is the wife of Vertumnus god of seasons, change and plant growth. || 
|-id=033
| 33 Polyhymnia || – || Polyhymnia, the Muse of singing of hymns and rhetoric in Greek mythology. The nine Muses are the inspirational goddesses of literature, science, and the arts. They are the daughters of Zeus and Mnemosyne. || 
|-id=034
| 34 Circe || – || Circe, goddess of magic in Greek mythology. The enchantress tried to influence Odysseus and changed his companions into pigs. || 
|-id=035
| 35 Leukothea || – || Leukothea, daughter of king Cadmus and Harmonia, the goddess of harmony and concord in Greek mythology. Leukothea later became the goddess of the sea and is also known as Ino. || 
|-id=036
| 36 Atalante || – || Atalanta, mythological Greek heroine, who would only marry the man defeating her in a footrace, while those who lost were killed. Hippomenes won the race against her with the help of three sacred apples he received from Aphrodite. || 
|-id=037
| 37 Fides || – || Fides, the Roman goddess of faith, oaths and honesty || 
|-id=038
| 38 Leda || – || Leda, queen of Sparta and mother of Helen of Troy in Greek mythology. She was seduced by Zeus in the guise of a swan (also see Leda and the Swan). || 
|-id=039
| 39 Laetitia || – || Laetitia, Roman goddess of gaiety || 
|-id=040
| 40 Harmonia || – || Harmonia, Greek goddess of harmony and concord. She is the daughter of Ares (god of war) and Aphrodite (goddess of love). || 
|-id=041
| 41 Daphne || – || Daphne, a fresh water nymph (Naiad) in Greek mythology || 
|-id=042
| 42 Isis || – || Isis, the Egyptian goddess who help the dead enter the afterlife. The name also alludes to Isis Pogson (1852–1945), British astronomer and meteorologist and daughter of the discoverer, Norman Pogson. || 
|-id=043
| 43 Ariadne || – || Ariadne, Cretan princess and daughter of king Minos from Greek mythology, who sent every seven years 14 young noble citizens to the labyrinth, to be eaten by the Minotaur. Ariadne fell in love with Theseus and helped him to find his way out of the Minotaur's labyrinth. || 
|-id=044
| 44 Nysa || – || The mythological region of Nysa. In Greek mythology, the mountainous was where the rain nymphs (Hyades) raised the infant god Dionysus. || 
|-id=045
| 45 Eugenia || – || Eugénie de Montijo (1826–1920), Empress of France and mother of Napoleon Eugene, Prince Imperial, after whom Antoine de Saint-Exupéry's character The Little Prince is based. (The asteroid's companion is named Petit-Prince) || 
|-id=046
| 46 Hestia || – || Hestia, Greek goddess of the hearth, home, and family. She is the daughter of the Titans Cronus and Rhea. Alternatively, she is one of the seven Hesperides, nymph daughters of the Titans Atlas and Hesperis. || 
|-id=047
| 47 Aglaja || – || Aglaea (Aglaja), one of the three Charites (Graces) in Greek mythology. Charites are the daughters of Zeus and Eurynome, an Oceanid (sea nymph). Her other two sisters are Thalia and Euphrosyne. || 
|-id=048
| 48 Doris || – || Doris, an Oceanid from Greek mythology, one of the many daughters of the Titans Oceanus and Tethys.  Doris and her brother Nereus are the parents of Nerites and 50 Nereids (also sea nymphs). || 
|-id=049
| 49 Pales || – || Pales, Roman goddess of shepherds, flocks and livestock || 
|-id=050
| 50 Virginia || – || The ancient Roman story of Verginia (Virginia), a girl stabbed by her father in order to save her from Appius Claudius Crassus in 448 B.C. It is also an allusion to U.S. state of Virginia. || 
|-id=051
| 51 Nemausa || – || The city of Nîmes in southern France (by its Latin name "Nemausa") || 
|-id=052
| 52 Europa || – || Europa, mythological Greek princess, abducted by Zeus in the form of a bull and gave birth to Minos, the first king of Crete. || 
|-id=053
| 53 Kalypso || – || Calypso, an Oceanid from Greek mythology, one of the many daughters of the Titans Oceanus and Tethys. Calypso kept Odysseus prisoner at Ogygia for seven years. || 
|-id=054
| 54 Alexandra || – || Alexander von Humboldt (1769–1859), German explorer || 
|-id=055
| 55 Pandora || – || Pandora, the first human woman in Greek mythology. She was created from clay by Hephaestus at the request of Zeus. || 
|-id=056
| 56 Melete || – || Melete, one of the three original muses before the Nine Olympian Muses were founded. Her sisters were Aoide and Mneme. || 
|-id=057
| 57 Mnemosyne || – || Mnemosyne, the goddess of memory in Greek mythology . She is the mother of the nine Muses with Zeus, and one of the 12 first-generation Titans, the children of Uranus (Father Sky) and Gaea (Mother Earth). || 
|-id=058
| 58 Concordia || – || Concordia, the Roman goddess of peace and concord. She is the daughter of Jupiter and Themis. || 
|-id=059
| 59 Elpis || – || Elpis, the personification and spirit of hope in Greek mythology. In the 1860s, there was a dispute about a new nomenclature proposed by Urbain Le Verrier who wanted to name this asteroid after its discoverer, Jean Chacornac (1823–1873). This was rejected by the community of astronomers. The asteroid was then named by Karl L. Littrow on a request by Edmund Weiss since Chacornac refused to submit a name (other than his own). The given name is an allusion to the "hope" that this dispute could be settled. || 
|-id=060
| 60 Echo || – || Echo, an Oread (mountain nymph) in Greek mythology, who, as a punishment, was only able to speak the last words spoken to her. When she fell in love with Narcissus, she was unable to tell him how she felt; and was forced to watch him as he fell in love with himself. || 
|-id=061
| 61 Danaë || – || Danaë, daughter of king Acrisius and mother of hero Perseus by Zeus in Greek mythology. Danaë was confined in a brass tower by her father to keep her a virgin. Zeus however, desired her, and came to her in the form of golden rain which streamed in through the roof of her confinement and down into her womb. || 
|-id=062
| 62 Erato || – || Erato, the Muse of love poetry in Greek mythology. The nine Muses are the inspirational goddesses of literature, science, and the arts. They are the daughters of Zeus and Mnemosyne. || 
|-id=063
| 63 Ausonia || – || The country of Italy, by its ancient Greek name for lower Italy, derived from king Auson, a son of Odysseus and Kallisto. The term "Ausones" was also applied by Greek writers to describe various Italic peoples. || 
|-id=064
| 64 Angelina || – || Astronomical station of Hungarian astronomer Franz Xaver von Zach (1754–1832), near Marseilles in France || 
|-id=065
| 65 Cybele || – || Cybele, mother goddess worshiped as "Mountain Mother" by the Phrygias, and adopted as "Great Mother" by the Greeks and Romans. This asteroid was originally named "Maximiliana", after Maximilian II, king of Bavaria. This non-classical name, however, was rejected by several astronomers, also see . || 
|-id=066
| 66 Maja || – || Maia, one of the Pleiades, the seven daughters of Titan Atlas and Oceanid nymph Pleione. Maia is the mother of the Olympian messenger god Hermes. || 
|-id=067
| 67 Asia || – || Asia, an Oceanid from Greek mythology, one of the many daughters of the Titans Oceanus and Tethys. This was the first asteroid discovered in Asia. English astronomer N. R. Pogson discovered it at Madras Observatory, India, in April 1861. || 
|-id=068
| 68 Leto || – || Leto, Goddess of motherhood in Greek mythology. She is the daughter of the Titans Coeus and Phoebe and the mother of Olympian god Apollo and goddess Artemis. || 
|-id=069
| 69 Hesperia || – || The country of Italy (by its Greek name Hesperia; "setting Sun" or "evening"). This asteroid was discovered one month after the Italian unification was proclaimed on 17 March 1861. || 
|-id=070
| 70 Panopaea || – || Panopaea, a Nereid (sea nymph) from Greek mythology, one of the 50 daughters of Nereus and Doris. She was invoked by sailors during storms. || 
|-id=071
| 71 Niobe || – || Niobe, daughter of king Tantalus in Greek mythology. The gods punished her by killing her seven sons and seven daughters and changing her into a rock. || 
|-id=072
| 72 Feronia || – || Feronia, Roman goddess of groves, wildlife and freedman || 
|-id=073
| 73 Klytia || – || Clytie, an Oceanid from Greek mythology, one of the many daughters of the Titans Oceanus and Tethys || 
|-id=074
| 74 Galatea || – || Galatea, a Nereid (sea nymph) from Greek mythology, one of the 50 daughters of Nereus and Doris, who loved the shepherd Acis. Alternatively, the name may refer to the statue of a woman created by sculptor Pygmalion. || 
|-id=075
| 75 Eurydike || – || Eurydice, an oak nymph and daughter of Apollo in Greek mythology. She was the wife of Orpheus, who failed to bring her back from the dead. With his enchanting music he softened the hearts of the gods who let him descend into the underworld under the condition that he must not look at her until both had reached the upper world. || 
|-id=076
| 76 Freia || – || Freyja, the goddess of love and beauty in Norse mythology || 
|-id=077
| 77 Frigga || – || Frigg, wife of Odin and queen of all the gods in Norse mythology || 
|-id=078
| 78 Diana || – || Diana, goddess of the hunt in Roman mythology. She is the daughter of Jupiter and Latona. Her Greek counterpart is Artemis. || 
|-id=079
| 79 Eurynome || – || Eurynome, an Oceanid from Greek mythology, one of the many daughters of the Titans Oceanus and Tethys. || 
|-id=080
| 80 Sappho || – || Sappho (c. 630 – c. 570 BC), Greek poet who, according to mythology, killed herself by jumping off the cliffs for love of the ferryman Phaon. || 
|-id=081
| 81 Terpsichore || – || Terpsichore, the Muse of dance and chorus in Greek mythology. The nine Muses are the inspirational goddesses of literature, science, and the arts. They are the daughters of Zeus and Mnemosyne. || 
|-id=082
| 82 Alkmene || – || Alcmene, mother of the divine hero Heracles in Greek mythology. Zeus slept with Alcmene disguised as her husband Amphitryon. || 
|-id=083
| 83 Beatrix || – || Beatrice Portinari (1265–1290), beloved of Italian poet Dante Alighieri || 
|-id=084
| 84 Klio || – || Clio, the Muse of history in Greek mythology. The nine Muses are the inspirational goddesses of literature, science, and the arts. They are the daughters of Zeus and Mnemosyne. || 
|-id=085
| 85 Io || – || Io, daughter of Inachus, king of Argos, and one of the mortal lovers of Zeus in Greek mythology. || 
|-id=086
| 86 Semele || – || Semele, the youngest daughter of king Cadmus and the mother of Dionysus by Zeus in Greek mythology || 
|-id=087
| 87 Sylvia || – || Rhea Sylvia, the mythical mother of the twins Romulus and Remus from Roman mythology (Src). Alternatively, it was named after Sylvie Petiaux-Hugo Flammarion, first wife of French astronomer Camille Flammarion (1842–1925) || 
|-id=088
| 88 Thisbe || – || Thisbe, lover of Pyramus in Classical mythology. The two Babylonian lovers are also prominent in the comedy  by Shakespeare. || 
|-id=089
| 89 Julia || – || Julia of Corsica (c. died 439), a virgin martyr who is venerated as a Christian saint. || 
|-id=090
| 90 Antiope || – || Antiope, an Amazon and daughter of Ares in Greek mythology. Alternatively, she was the daughter of Nycteus, king of Thebes, and the lover of Zeus. This minor planet is likely the first double asteroid ever discovered. || 
|-id=091
| 91 Aegina || – || Aegina, daughter of the river-god Asopus and the river-nymph Metope. She was changed into the island of Aegina by Zeus. || 
|-id=092
| 92 Undina || – || Heroine of the fairy-tale novella Undine by German writer Friedrich de la Motte Fouqué (1777–1843) || 
|-id=093
| 93 Minerva || – || Minerva, goddess of wisdom and strategic warfare and daughter of Jupiter and Metis in Roman mythology. Her Greek equivalent is Athena. || 
|-id=094
| 94 Aurora || – || Aurora, goddess of the dawn in Roman mythology. Her Greek counterpart is Eos, who is the daughter of the Titans Hyperion and Theia. || 
|-id=095
| 95 Arethusa || – || Arethusa, one of the seven Hesperides, nymph daughters of the Titans Atlas and Hesperis || 
|-id=096
| 96 Aegle || – || Aegle, one of the seven Hesperides, nymph daughters of the Titans Atlas and Hesperis || 
|-id=097
| 97 Klotho || – || Clotho (Klotho), one of the Three Fates or Moirai who spin (Clotho), draw out (Lachesis) and cut (Atropos) the thread of Life in ancient Greek mythology. || 
|-id=098
| 98 Ianthe || – || Ianthe, a girl who married Iphis after Isis turned Iphis from a woman into a man. Alternatively, she was an Oceanid from Greek mythology, one of the many daughters of the Titans Oceanus and Tethys. || 
|-id=099
| 99 Dike || – || Dike,  minor Greek goddess of human justice and the spirit of moral order, daughter of Zeus and Themis || 
|-id=100
| 100 Hekate || – || Hecate, Greek goddess (The name "Hecate" also sounds like Greek hekaton meaning "one hundred.") || 
|}

101–200 

|-
| 101 Helena || – || Helen of Troy, the most beautiful woman in the world in Greek mythology. The wife of king Menelaus of Sparta was abducted by Paris which led to the Trojan War. || 
|-id=102
| 102 Miriam || – || Miriam, Biblical prophetess || 
|-id=103
| 103 Hera || – || Hera, Greek goddess of marriage, childbirth, and family. She is the daughter of the Titans Cronus and Rhea, and sister and wife of Zeus. || 
|-id=104
| 104 Klymene || – || One of various Greek figures named Clymene || 
|-id=105
| 105 Artemis || – || Artemis, Greek goddess of the hunt, forests, and the Moon. She was the daughter of Zeus by Leto and twin sister of Apollo. Her Roman equivalent is Diana. || 
|-id=106
| 106 Dione || – || Dione, an Oceanid from Greek mythology, one of the many daughters of the Titans Oceanus and Tethys. She was one of the wives of Zeus and mother of Aphrodite, the goddess of love, beauty and sexuality. || 
|-id=107
| 107 Camilla || – || Camilla, queen of the Volsci  from Roman mythology. Less likely, the name refers to French astronomer Camille Flammarion (1842–1925). || 
|-id=108
| 108 Hecuba || – || Hecuba, wife of King Priam during the Trojan War in Greek mythology || 
|-id=109
| 109 Felicitas || – || Felicitas, goddess of happiness in Roman mythology. She is often portrayed holding a caduceus (staff) and a cornucopia (horn of plenty). || 
|-id=110
| 110 Lydia || – || Lydia, ancient region of Asia Minor || 
|-id=111
| 111 Ate || – || Atë, goddess of mischief, delusion, ruin, and folly in Greek mythology. She is the daughter of Zeus or of Eris. || 
|-id=112
| 112 Iphigenia || – || Iphigenia, mythological Greek princess || 
|-id=113
| 113 Amalthea || – || Amalthea, mythological Greek nursemaid || 
|-id=114
| 114 Kassandra || – || Cassandra, mythological Trojan prophetess || 
|-id=115
| 115 Thyra || – || Thyra, wife of King Gorm of Denmark || 
|-id=116
| 116 Sirona || – || Sirona, Celtic goddess || 
|-id=117
| 117 Lomia || – || Misspelling of Lamia queen of Libya, lover of Zeus || 
|-id=118
| 118 Peitho || – || Peitho, Greek goddess || 
|-id=119
| 119 Althaea || – || Althaea, Greek mother of Meleager || 
|-id=120
| 120 Lachesis || – || Lachesis, one of the Three Fates or Moirai who spin (Clotho), draw out (Lachesis) and cut (Atropos) the thread of Life in ancient Greek mythology. || 
|-id=121
| 121 Hermione || – || Hermione, mythological Greek princess || 
|-id=122
| 122 Gerda || – || Gerðr, Norse goddess || 
|-id=123
| 123 Brunhild || – || Brünnehilde, Norse Valkyrie || 
|-id=124
| 124 Alkeste || – || Alcestis, mythological Greek woman || 
|-id=125
| 125 Liberatrix || – || Possibly Adolphe Thiers (1797–1877), French president during the Franco-Prussian War. Also possibly Joan of Arc. || 
|-id=126
| 126 Velleda || – || Veleda, Germanic priestess, leader of Batavian uprising against the Romans || 
|-id=127
| 127 Johanna || – || Joan of Arc (1412–1431), saint and heroine of France || 
|-id=128
| 128 Nemesis || – || Nemesis, Greek goddess || 
|-id=129
| 129 Antigone || – || Antigone, mythological Greek princess || 
|-id=130
| 130 Elektra || – || Electra, mythological Greek princess || 
|-id=131
| 131 Vala || – || Völva, mythological Norse prophetess || 
|-id=132
| 132 Aethra || – || Aethra, Greek mother of Theseus || 
|-id=133
| 133 Cyrene || – || Cyrene, Greek lover of Apollo || 
|-id=134
| 134 Sophrosyne || – || Sophrosyne, Plato's concept of moderation || 
|-id=135
| 135 Hertha || – || Nerthus (Hertha), Norse goddess, also see  || 
|-id=136
| 136 Austria || – || Austria, country || 
|-id=137
| 137 Meliboea || – || Meliboea, various Greek figures || 
|-id=138
| 138 Tolosa || – || Latin for Toulouse, France || 
|-id=139
| 139 Juewa || – || Chinese for 'Star of China's Fortune' || 
|-id=140
| 140 Siwa || – || Siwa, Slavic goddess || 
|-id=141
| 141 Lumen || – || Lumen : Récits de l'infini, book by Camille Flammarion (1842–1925) || 
|-id=142
| 142 Polana || – || Pula, city now in Croatia || 
|-id=143
| 143 Adria || – || Adriatic Sea || 
|-id=144
| 144 Vibilia || – || Vibilia, Roman goddess and patroness of journeyings || 
|-id=145
| 145 Adeona || – || Adeona, Roman goddess and patroness of homecomings || 
|-id=146
| 146 Lucina || – || Lucina, Roman goddess || 
|-id=147
| 147 Protogeneia || – || Protogeneia, mythological Greek princess || 
|-id=148
| 148 Gallia || – || Gaul, Roman province || 
|-id=149
| 149 Medusa || – || Medusa, mythological Greek monster || 
|-id=150
| 150 Nuwa || – || Nüwa, Chinese mythological figure || 
|-id=151
| 151 Abundantia || – || Abundantia, Roman goddess || 
|-id=152
| 152 Atala || – || Atala, eponymous hero of novel by François-René de Chateaubriand || 
|-id=153
| 153 Hilda || – || Daughter of Austrian astronomer Theodor von Oppolzer (1841–1886) || 
|-id=154
| 154 Bertha || – || Berthe Martin-Flammarion, sister of French astronomer Camille Flammarion (1842–1925) || 
|-id=155
| 155 Scylla || – || Scylla, Greek mythological monster || 
|-id=156
| 156 Xanthippe || – || Xanthippe, wife of Socrates || 
|-id=157
| 157 Dejanira || – || Deianira, mythological Greek princess || 
|-id=158
| 158 Koronis || – || Coronis, various Greek figures || 
|-id=159
| 159 Aemilia || – || Via Aemilia, Roman road || 
|-id=160
| 160 Una || – || Una, character in Edmund Spenser's The Faerie Queene || 
|-id=161
| 161 Athor || – || Hathor, Egyptian goddess || 
|-id=162
| 162 Laurentia || – || Joseph Jean Pierre Laurent (died 1900), French amateur astronomer || 
|-id=163
| 163 Erigone || – || Erigone, various Greek figures || 
|-id=164
| 164 Eva || – || unknown origin of name; it may refer to Eve. || 
|-id=165
| 165 Loreley || – || The Lorelei, character in German folklore || 
|-id=166
| 166 Rhodope || – || Queen Rhodope, Greek mythology || 
|-id=167
| 167 Urda || – || Urd, Norse Norn || 
|-id=168
| 168 Sibylla || – || The Sibyls, Greek prophetesses || 
|-id=169
| 169 Zelia || – || Niece of French astronomer Camille Flammarion (1842–1925) || 
|-id=170
| 170 Maria || – || Maria, sister of Italian astronomer Antonio Abetti (1846–1928) || 
|-id=171
| 171 Ophelia || – || Ophelia, character in Shakespeare's Hamlet || 
|-id=172
| 172 Baucis || – || Baucis, Greek mythological woman || 
|-id=173
| 173 Ino || – || Ino, mythological Greek woman || 
|-id=174
| 174 Phaedra || – || Phaedra, Greek mythological woman || 
|-id=175
| 175 Andromache || – || Andromache, Trojan wife of Hector || 
|-id=176
| 176 Iduna || – || Ydun, a club that hosted an astronomical conference in Stockholm, Sweden (the club was probably named after Iduna, a Norse goddess) || 
|-id=177
| 177 Irma || – || unknown origin of name || 
|-id=178
| 178 Belisana || – || Belisana, Celtic goddess || 
|-id=179
| 179 Klytaemnestra || – || Clytemnestra, Greek mythological queen || 
|-id=180
| 180 Garumna || – || Ancient name for river Garonne, France || 
|-id=181
| 181 Eucharis || – || Eucharis, Greek nymph || 
|-id=182
| 182 Elsa || – || Elsbeth – the Austrian variant of "Elisabeth" a common female first name – and only later changed into a more lyrical "Elsa" with the consent of the discoverer, Johann Palisa. It may also refer to the Empress Elisabeth of Austria (1854–1898), or other person or characters. || 
|-id=183
| 183 Istria || – || Istria, peninsula in Croatia and Slovenia || 
|-id=184
| 184 Dejopeja || – || Deiopaea, Roman nymph || 
|-id=185
| 185 Eunike || – || Eunice (Eunike), a Nereid (sea nymph) from Greek mythology, one of the 50 daughters of Nereus and Doris, whose name means "happy victory". It was chosen to commemorate the Treaty of San Stefano, which was signed two days after the discovery of this asteroid by C. H. F. Peters in March 1878. || 
|-id=186
| 186 Celuta || – || Celuta, the main character in the short novella René by French author François-René de Chateaubriand (1768–1848) || 
|-id=187
| 187 Lamberta || – || Johann Heinrich Lambert (1728–1777), Swiss polymath || 
|-id=188
| 188 Menippe || – || Menippe, Greek daughter of Orion || 
|-id=189
| 189 Phthia || – || Phthia, various Greek figures and places || 
|-id=190
| 190 Ismene || – || Ismene, Greek daughter of Oedipus || 
|-id=191
| 191 Kolga || – || Kólga, daughter of Ægir in Norse mythology || 
|-id=192
| 192 Nausikaa || – || Nausicaa, mythological Greek princess || 
|-id=193
| 193 Ambrosia || – || Ambrosia, Greek food of the gods || 
|-id=194
| 194 Prokne || – || Procne, sister of Philomela in Greek mythology || 
|-id=195
| 195 Eurykleia || – || Eurycleia, Greek nurse of Odysseus || 
|-id=196
| 196 Philomela || – || Philomela, sister of Procne in Greek mythology || 
|-id=197
| 197 Arete || – || Arete, Greek mother of Nausicaa || 
|-id=198
| 198 Ampella || – || Ampelos, Greek friend of Dionysus || 
|-id=199
| 199 Byblis || – || Byblis, Greek mythological woman || 
|-id=200
| 200 Dynamene || – || Dynamene, a Nereid (sea nymph) from Greek mythology, one of the 50 daughters of Nereus and Doris. || 
|}

201–300 

|-
| 201 Penelope || – || Penelope, Greek wife of Odysseus || 
|-id=202
| 202 Chryseïs || – || Chryseis, mythological Trojan woman || 
|-id=203
| 203 Pompeja || – || Pompeii, ruined Roman town || 
|-id=204
| 204 Kallisto || – || Callisto, Greek nymph || 
|-id=205
| 205 Martha || – || Martha, woman in the New Testament || 
|-id=206
| 206 Hersilia || – || Hersilia, Roman wife of Romulus || 
|-id=207
| 207 Hedda || – || Hedwig, wife of German astronomer Friedrich August Theodor Winnecke (1835–1897) || 
|-id=208
| 208 Lacrimosa || – || Our Lady of Sorrows, a title referring to Mary, the mother of Jesus || 
|-id=209
| 209 Dido || – || Dido, mythological Carthaginian queen || 
|-id=210
| 210 Isabella || – || Unknown origin of name || 
|-id=211
| 211 Isolda || – || Isolde, heroine of the legend of Tristan and Iseult || 
|-id=212
| 212 Medea || – || Medea, Greek mythological witch || 
|-id=213
| 213 Lilaea || – || Lilaea, Greek Naiad || 
|-id=214
| 214 Aschera || – || Astarte (Aschera, Astoreth), Sidonian and Phoenician goddess of love and fertility, also see  || 
|-id=215
| 215 Oenone || – || Oenone, Greek nymph || 
|-id=216
| 216 Kleopatra || – || Cleopatra (69–30 BC), Queen of Egypt || 
|-id=217
| 217 Eudora || – || Eudora, Greek Hyad || 
|-id=218
| 218 Bianca || – || Bianca Bianchi, stage name of the German opera singer Bertha Schwarz (1855–1947) || 
|-id=219
| 219 Thusnelda || – || Thusnelda, wife of Germanic warrior Arminius || 
|-id=220
| 220 Stephania || – || Princess Stéphanie of Belgium (1864–1945) || 
|-id=221
| 221 Eos || – || Eos, Greek goddess || 
|-id=222
| 222 Lucia || – || Lucia, daughter of Austrian explorer Count Johann Nepomuk Wilczek (1837–1922) || 
|-id=223
| 223 Rosa || – || Unknown origin of name || 
|-id=224
| 224 Oceana || – || The Pacific Ocean || 
|-id=225
| 225 Henrietta || – || Henrietta, wife of French astronomer Pierre Janssen (1824–1907) || 
|-id=226
| 226 Weringia || – || Währing, part of Vienna || 
|-id=227
| 227 Philosophia || – || Philosophy || 
|-id=228
| 228 Agathe || – || Agathe, daughter of Austrian astronomer Theodor von Oppolzer (1841–1886) || 
|-id=229
|-id=230
| 230 Athamantis || – || Athamantis, Greek daughter of Athamas || 
|-id=231
| 231 Vindobona || – || Latin name for Vienna, Austria || 
|-id=232
| 232 Russia || – || Russia, country || 
|-id=233
| 233 Asterope || – || Sterope, Greek Pleiad || 
|-id=234
| 234 Barbara || – || Saint Barbara || 
|-id=235
| 235 Carolina || – || Caroline Island, now part of Kiribati || 
|-id=236
| 236 Honoria || – || Honoria, Roman goddess || 
|-id=237
| 237 Coelestina || – || Coelestine, wife of Austrian astronomer Theodor von Oppolzer (1841–1886) || 
|-id=238
| 238 Hypatia || – || Hypatia (c. 350–415), Greek philosopher || 
|-id=239
| 239 Adrastea || – || Adrasteia, Greek goddess || 
|-id=240
| 240 Vanadis || – || Vanadis, Norse goddess || 
|-id=241
| 241 Germania || – || Latin name for Germany || 
|-id=242
| 242 Kriemhild || – || Kriemhild, mythological Germanic princess || 
|-id=243
| 243 Ida || – || Ida, Cretan nymph, after whom Mount Ida is named, where the mythical dactyls lived ((243) Ida I Dactyl) || 
|-id=244
| 244 Sita || – || Sita, Hindu wife of Rama || 
|-id=245
| 245 Vera || – || Unknown origin of name. The asteroid's name was suggested by the wife of the discoverer, N. R. Pogson (1829–1891) || 
|-id=246
| 246 Asporina || – || Asporina, goddess worshipped in Asia Minor || 
|-id=247
| 247 Eukrate || – || Eukrate, a Nereid (sea nymph) from Greek mythology, one of the 50 daughters of Nereus and Doris. || 
|-id=248
| 248 Lameia || – || Lamia, lover of Zeus || 
|-id=249
| 249 Ilse || – || Ilse, legendary German princess || 
|-id=250
| 250 Bettina || – || Bettina Caroline de Rothschild (1858–1892), Austrian Baroness and wife of Albert Salomon Anselm von Rothschild, who named the asteroid after her. The discoverer, Johann Palisa, reportedly sold the naming rights for 50 pounds in order to help fund his expedition to observe the total solar eclipse of August 29, 1886. || 
|-id=251
| 251 Sophia || – || Sophia, wife of German astronomer Hugo von Seeliger (1849–1924) || 
|-id=252
| 252 Clementina || – || Unknown origin of name. The asteroid was named by its discoverer, Henri Joseph Anastase Perrotin (1845–1904) || 
|-id=253
| 253 Mathilde || – || Mathilde, wife of French astronomer Maurice Loewy (1833–1907) || 
|-id=254
| 254 Augusta || – || Auguste von Littrow (1819–1890), author, and champion of women's rights; wife of Austrian astronomer Carl Ludwig von Littrow || 
|-id=255
| 255 Oppavia || – || Opava, now Czech Republic || 
|-id=256
| 256 Walpurga || – || Saint Walpurga || 
|-id=257
| 257 Silesia || – || Silesia, region of central Europe || 
|-id=258
| 258 Tyche || – || Tyche, Greek goddess || 
|-id=259
| 259 Aletheia || – || Veritas (Aletheia), Greek goddess || 
|-id=260
| 260 Huberta || – || Saint Hubertus || 
|-id=261
| 261 Prymno || – || Prymno, one of the Oceanids, daughters of the Titans Oceanus and Tethys in Greek mythology || 
|-id=262
| 262 Valda || – || Unknown origin of name. The asteroid's name was proposed by the Baroness Bettina Caroline de Rothschild, see  || 
|-id=263
| 263 Dresda || – || The city of Dresden in Germany || 
|-id=264
| 264 Libussa || – || Libussa, legendary founder of Prague || 
|-id=265
| 265 Anna || – || Anny Weiss (née Kretschmar), daughter-in-law of Austrian astronomer Edmund Weiss (1837–1917), director of the Vienna Observatory where this asteroid was discovered by Johann Palisa; also see  and  || 
|-id=266
| 266 Aline || – || Linda von Schuster (née Weiss), daughter of Austrian astronomer Edmund Weiss (1837–1917), director of the Vienna Observatory where this asteroid was discovered by Johann Palisa; also see  and  || 
|-id=267
| 267 Tirza || – || Tirzah, Biblical figure || 
|-id=268
| 268 Adorea || – || Adorea, Roman cake || 
|-id=269
| 269 Justitia || – || Justitia or Themis, Greek goddess || 
|-id=270
| 270 Anahita || – || Anahita, Persian goddess || 
|-id=271
| 271 Penthesilea || – || Penthesilea, mythological Amazon queen || 
|-id=272
| 272 Antonia || – || Unknown origin of name || 
|-id=273
| 273 Atropos || – || Atropos, one of the Three Fates or Moirai who spin (Clotho), draw out (Lachesis) and cut (Atropos) the thread of Life in ancient Greek mythology. || 
|-id=274
| 274 Philagoria || – || Philagoria, recreation club in Olmütz || 
|-id=275
| 275 Sapientia || – || Latin for wisdom || 
|-id=276
| 276 Adelheid || – || Unknown origin of name || 
|-id=277
| 277 Elvira || – || Character in books by Alphonse de Lamartine (1790–1869) || 
|-id=278
| 278 Paulina || – || Unknown origin of name || 
|-id=279
| 279 Thule || – || Thule, mythical northern land (usually identified with Scandinavia) || 
|-id=280
| 280 Philia || – || Philia, Greek nymph || 
|-id=281
| 281 Lucretia || – || Caroline Herschel (1750–1848), German astronomer || 
|-id=282
| 282 Clorinde || – || Clorinda, heroine of Torquato Tasso's poem Jerusalem Delivered || 
|-id=283
| 283 Emma || – || Unknown origin of name || 
|-id=284
| 284 Amalia || – || Unknown origin of name || 
|-id=285
| 285 Regina || – || Unknown origin of name || 
|-id=286
| 286 Iclea || – || Icléa, heroine of French astronomer Camille Flammarion's novel Uranie || 
|-id=287
| 287 Nephthys || – || Nephthys, Egyptian goddess || 
|-id=288
| 288 Glauke || – || Glauke, Greek daughter of Creon || 
|-id=289
| 289 Nenetta || – || French slang for a frivolous woman || 
|-id=290
| 290 Bruna || – || Brno, now Czech Republic || 
|-id=291
| 291 Alice || – || Unknown origin of name. The asteroid was named by the French Astronomical Society. || 
|-id=292
| 292 Ludovica || – || Unknown origin of name. The asteroid was named by the French Astronomical Society. || 
|-id=293
| 293 Brasilia || – || Brazil, country || 
|-id=294
| 294 Felicia || – || Unknown origin of name || 
|-id=295
| 295 Theresia || – || Unknown origin of name. Previously, the name was erroneously attributed to Maria Theresa (1717–1780), Holy Roman Empress and queen of Hungary and Bohemia. || 
|-id=296
| 296 Phaëtusa || – || Phaethusa, Greek goddess || 
|-id=297
| 297 Caecilia || – || Unknown origin of name || 
|-id=298
| 298 Baptistina || – || Unknown origin of name || 
|-id=299
| 299 Thora || – || Thor, god of thunder, weather and storms in Norse mythology || 
|-id=300
| 300 Geraldina || – || Unknown origin of name || 
|}

301–400 

|-
| 301 Bavaria || – || Bavaria, region of Germany || 
|-id=302
| 302 Clarissa || – || Unknown origin of name || 
|-id=303
| 303 Josephina || – || Discoverer Elia Millosevich simply stated "in homage to a person dear to me" || 
|-id=304
| 304 Olga || – || Olga, niece of German astronomer Friedrich Wilhelm Argelander (1799–1875) || 
|-id=305
| 305 Gordonia || – || James Gordon Bennett Jr. (1841–1918), editor of the New York Herald, founded by his father || 
|-id=306
| 306 Unitas || – || Book by Italian astronomer Angelo Secchi (1818–1878); also named for the unity of Italy || 
|-id=307
| 307 Nike || – || Nike, Greek goddess || 
|-id=308
| 308 Polyxo || – || Polyxo, Greek Hyad || 
|-id=309
| 309 Fraternitas || – || Latin for fraternity || 
|-id=310
| 310 Margarita || – || Unknown origin of name || 
|-id=311
| 311 Claudia || – || Unknown origin of name || 
|-id=312
| 312 Pierretta || – || Unknown origin of name || 
|-id=313
| 313 Chaldaea || – || Chaldea, Babylonian nation || 
|-id=314
| 314 Rosalia || – || Unknown origin of name || 
|-id=315
| 315 Constantia || – || Constancy || 
|-id=316
| 316 Goberta || – || Unknown origin of name || 
|-id=317
| 317 Roxane || – || Roxana (c. 340–310 BC), wife of Alexander the Great || 
|-id=318
| 318 Magdalena || – || Unknown origin of name || 
|-id=319
| 319 Leona || – || Unknown origin of name || 
|-id=320
| 320 Katharina || – || Mother of discoverer Johann Palisa (1848–1925) || 
|-id=321
| 321 Florentina || – || Florentine, daughter of the discoverer, Austrian astronomer Johann Palisa || 
|-id=322
| 322 Phaeo || – || Phaeo, Greek Hyad || 
|-id=323
| 323 Brucia || – || Catherine Wolfe Bruce (1816–1900), American patron of astronomy || 
|-id=324
| 324 Bamberga || – || Bamberg, Germany || 
|-id=325
| 325 Heidelberga || – || Heidelberg, Germany || 
|-id=326
| 326 Tamara || – || Tamar of Georgia (c. 1160–1213), queen of Georgia || 
|-id=327
| 327 Columbia || – || Christopher Columbus (1451–1506), an Italian explorer, navigator, who initiated the permanent European colonization of the Americas || 
|-id=328
| 328 Gudrun || – || Gudrun, Norse wife of Sigurd || 
|-id=329
| 329 Svea || – || Sweden || 
|-id=330
| 330 Adalberta || A910 CB || Adalbert Merx (1838–1909), German Protestant theologian and orientalist;  father-in-law of the discoverer, Max Wolf || 
|-id=331
| 331 Etheridgea || – || Unknown origin of name || 
|-id=332
| 332 Siri || – || Unknown origin of name || 
|-id=333
| 333 Badenia || 1892 A || Baden, region of Germany || 
|-id=334
| 334 Chicago || 1892 L || Chicago, United States || 
|-id=335
| 335 Roberta || 1892 C || Carl Robert Osten-Sacken (1828–1906), Baltic-German diplomat and entomologist || 
|-id=336
| 336 Lacadiera || 1892 D || La Cadière-d'Azur, village in Var, France || 
|-id=337
| 337 Devosa || 1892 E || Unknown origin of name || 
|-id=338
| 338 Budrosa || 1892 F || Unknown origin of name || 
|-id=339
| 339 Dorothea || 1892 G || Dorothea Klumpke (1861–1942), American astronomer || 
|-id=340
| 340 Eduarda || 1892 H || Heinrich Eduard von Lade (1817–1904), German banker and amateur astronomer || 
|-id=341
| 341 California || 1892 J || California, US state || 
|-id=342
| 342 Endymion || 1892 K || Endymion, Greek mythology || 
|-id=343
| 343 Ostara || 1892 N || Ostara, Old High German name for Eostre, the Anglo-Saxon goddess of spring, reconstructed by Jacob Grimm in his Deutsche Mythologie || 
|-id=344
| 344 Desiderata || 1892 M || Désirée Clary (1777–1860), Queen of Sweden and Norway || 
|-id=345
| 345 Tercidina || 1892 O || Unknown origin of name || 
|-id=346
| 346 Hermentaria || 1892 P || Herment, village in Puy-de-Dôme, France || 
|-id=347
| 347 Pariana || 1892 Q || Unknown origin of name || 
|-id=348
| 348 May || 1892 R || Karl May (1842–1912), German author || 
|-id=349
| 349 Dembowska || 1892 T || Ercole Dembowski (1812–1881), Italian astronomer || 
|-id=350
| 350 Ornamenta || 1892 U || Antoinette Horneman from Scheveningen, daughter of a Dutch mariner. She was a very zealous member of the Société astronomique de France || 
|-id=351
| 351 Yrsa || 1892 V || Unknown origin of name; it may refer to Yrsa, queen in Norse mythology || 
|-id=352
| 352 Gisela || 1893 B || Gisela Wolf, wife of the discoverer, Max Wolf (1863–1932) || 
|-id=353
| 353 Ruperto-Carola || 1893 F || Ruprecht Karls University of Heidelberg || 
|-id=354
| 354 Eleonora || 1893 A || Unknown origin of name || 
|-id=355
| 355 Gabriella || 1893 E || Gabrielle Flammarion (1877–1962), French astronomer || 
|-id=356
| 356 Liguria || 1893 G || Liguria, region of Italy || 
|-id=357
| 357 Ninina || 1893 J || Unknown origin of name || 
|-id=358
| 358 Apollonia || 1893 K || Apollonia, Ancient Greek colony in Illyria || 
|-id=359
| 359 Georgia || 1893 M || King George II of Great Britain (1683–1760) || 
|-id=360
| 360 Carlova || 1893 N || Unknown origin of name; cf. discoverer Charlois || 
|-id=361
| 361 Bononia || 1893 P || Latin name for Bologna, Italy, and for Boulogne-sur-Mer, France || 
|-id=362
| 362 Havnia || 1893 R || Latin name for Copenhagen, Denmark || 
|-id=363
| 363 Padua || 1893 S || Padua, Italy || 
|-id=364
| 364 Isara || 1893 T || River Isère, France || 
|-id=365
| 365 Corduba || 1893 V || Latin name for Córdoba, Spain || 
|-id=366
| 366 Vincentina || 1893 W || Vincenzo Cerulli (1859–1927), Italian astronomer || 
|-id=367
| 367 Amicitia || 1893 AA || Latin for friendship || 
|-id=368
| 368 Haidea || 1893 AB || Unknown origin of name || 
|-id=369
| 369 Aëria || 1893 AE || Air, one of the four classical elements || 
|-id=370
| 370 Modestia || 1893 AC || Modesty || 
|-id=371
| 371 Bohemia || 1893 AD || Bohemia, region of Czech Republic || 
|-id=372
| 372 Palma || 1893 AH || Palma de Mallorca, Spain || 
|-id=373
| 373 Melusina || 1893 AJ || Probably Melusine, mythological French mermaid, associated with the origins of the Lusignan dynasty || 
|-id=374
| 374 Burgundia || 1893 AK || Burgundy, region of France || 
|-id=375
| 375 Ursula || 1893 AL || Unknown origin of name || 
|-id=376
| 376 Geometria || 1893 AM || Geometry || 
|-id=377
| 377 Campania || 1893 AN || Campania, region of Italy || 
|-id=378
| 378 Holmia || 1893 AP || Latin name for Stockholm, Sweden || 
|-id=379
| 379 Huenna || 1894 AQ || Latin name for Hven, Swedish island || 
|-id=380
| 380 Fiducia || 1894 AR || Latin for confidence || 
|-id=381
| 381 Myrrha || 1894 AS || Myrrha, Greek mythological princess || 
|-id=382
| 382 Dodona || 1894 AT || Dodona (now Dodoni), Greece || 
|-id=383
| 383 Janina || 1894 AU || Unknown origin of name || 
|-id=384
| 384 Burdigala || 1894 AV || Latin name for Bordeaux, France || 
|-id=385
| 385 Ilmatar || 1894 AX || Ilmatar, Finnish goddess || 
|-id=386
| 386 Siegena || 1894 AY || Siegen, Germany || 
|-id=387
| 387 Aquitania || 1894 AZ || Aquitaine, region of France || 
|-id=388
| 388 Charybdis || 1894 BA || Charybdis, mythological Greek monster || 
|-id=389
| 389 Industria || 1894 BB || Latin for diligence || 
|-id=390
| 390 Alma || 1894 BC || Alma River on the Crimean peninsula || 
|-id=391
| 391 Ingeborg || 1894 BE || Unknown origin of name; it may refer to Ingeborg from Norse mythology || 
|-id=392
| 392 Wilhelmina || 1894 BF || Queen Wilhelmina of the Netherlands (1880–1962) || 
|-id=393
| 393 Lampetia || 1894 BG || Lampetia, various Greek figures || 
|-id=394
| 394 Arduina || 1894 BH || Arduinna, Gaulish goddess || 
|-id=395
| 395 Delia || 1894 BK || Alternative name for the Greek goddess Artemis || 
|-id=396
| 396 Aeolia || 1894 BL || Aeolis or Aeolia, an ancient region of Asia Minor; or, the Aeolian Islands, Italy || 
|-id=397
| 397 Vienna || 1894 BM || Vienna, Austria || 
|-id=398
| 398 Admete || 1894 BN || Admete, Greek mythological woman || 
|-id=399
| 399 Persephone || 1895 BP || Persephone, Greek goddess || 
|-id=400
| 400 Ducrosa || 1895 BU || J. Ducros, French mechanician at Nice Observatory || 
|}

401–500 

|-
| 401 Ottilia || 1895 BT || Ottilia, character in German folklore || 
|-id=402
| 402 Chloë || 1895 BW || Chloe, shepherdess from Greek mythology || 
|-id=403
| 403 Cyane || 1895 BX || Cyane, a nymph from Greek mythology || 
|-id=404
| 404 Arsinoë || 1895 BY || Arsinoe, mother of Orestes from Greek mythology || 
|-id=405
| 405 Thia || 1895 BZ || Theia, one of the twelve Titans from Greek mythology || 
|-id=406
| 406 Erna || 1895 CB || Erna Bidschof, granddaughter of Austrian astronomer Johann Palisa (1848–1925) || 
|-id=407
| 407 Arachne || 1895 CC || Arachne, Greek mythological woman || 
|-id=408
| 408 Fama || 1895 CD || Pheme (Fama), Roman goddess || 
|-id=409
| 409 Aspasia || 1895 CE || Aspasia (c. 470–400 BC), mistress of Pericles, Greek statesman and general of Athens during its golden age || 
|-id=410
| 410 Chloris || 1896 CH || Chloris, Greek goddess || 
|-id=411
| 411 Xanthe || 1896 CJ || Xanthe, an Oceanid (sea nymph) from Greek mythology. The numerous Oceanids are the daughters of Oceanus and Tethys (Titans). || 
|-id=412
| 412 Elisabetha || 1896 CK || Elise Wolf (1840–1924), mother of the discoverer Max Wolf || 
|-id=413
| 413 Edburga || 1896 CL || unknown origin of name || 
|-id=414
| 414 Liriope || 1896 CN || Liriope, mother of Narcissus from Greek mythology || 
|-id=415
| 415 Palatia || 1896 CO || The Electorate of the Palatinate, region of Germany || 
|-id=416
| 416 Vaticana || 1896 CS || Vatican Hill, Rome || 
|-id=417
| 417 Suevia || 1896 CT || Suevia, a fraternity of Heidelberg University || 
|-id=418
| 418 Alemannia || 1896 CV || Alemannia, a fraternity of Heidelberg University || 
|-id=419
| 419 Aurelia || 1896 CW || unknown origin of name || 
|-id=420
| 420 Bertholda || 1896 CY || Berthold I of Zähringen (c. 1000–1078), Margrave of Baden || 
|-id=421
| 421 Zähringia || 1896 CZ || The Zähringen family of Baden || 
|-id=422
| 422 Berolina || 1896 DA || Berolina, Latin name for the city of Berlin, Germany || 
|-id=423
| 423 Diotima || 1896 DB || Diotima of Mantinea, Greek teacher of Socrates || 
|-id=424
| 424 Gratia || 1896 DF || The Graces, Roman mythology || 
|-id=425
| 425 Cornelia || 1896 DC || Cornelia Africana, daughter of Scipio Africanus || 
|-id=426
| 426 Hippo || 1897 DH || Hippo Regius, now Annaba, ancient town in Algeria || 
|-id=427
| 427 Galene || 1897 DJ || Galene, a Nereid (sea nymph) from Greek mythology, one of the 50 daughters of Nereus and Doris. || 
|-id=428
| 428 Monachia || 1897 DK || Monachia, Latin name for the German city of Munich || 
|-id=429
| 429 Lotis || 1897 DL || Lotis, a nymph in Greek mythology || 
|-id=430
| 430 Hybris || 1897 DM || Hubris, Greek goddess || 
|-id=431
| 431 Nephele || 1897 DN || Nephele, a nymph in Greek mythology || 
|-id=432
| 432 Pythia || 1897 DO || The Pythia, Greek prophetess || 
|-id=433
| 433 Eros || 1898 DQ || Eros, Greek god || 
|-id=434
| 434 Hungaria || 1898 DR || Latin for Hungary, a country in Central Europe || 
|-id=435
| 435 Ella || 1898 DS || unknown origin of name || 
|-id=436
| 436 Patricia || 1898 DT || unknown origin of name || 
|-id=437
| 437 Rhodia || 1898 DP || Rhodia, an Oceanid (sea nymph) from Greek mythology || 
|-id=438
| 438 Zeuxo || 1898 DU || Zeuxo, an Oceanid in Greek mythology || 
|-id=439
| 439 Ohio || 1898 EB || Ohio, U.S. state and river || 
|-id=440
| 440 Theodora || 1898 EC || Theodora, daughter of Julius F. Stone, benefactor and time trustee of the Ohio State University || 
|-id=441
| 441 Bathilde || 1898 ED || unknown origin of name || 
|-id=442
| 442 Eichsfeldia || 1899 EE || The region of Eichsfeld, located in Lower Saxony, Germany || 
|-id=443
| 443 Photographica || 1899 EF || Photography, the method first used by Max Wolf (1863–1932) to discover asteroids || 
|-id=444
| 444 Gyptis || 1899 EL || Gyptis, wife of Protis, founder of Marseille, France || 
|-id=445
| 445 Edna || 1899 EX || Edna, wife of Julius F. Stone, benefactor and time trustee of the Ohio State University || 
|-id=446
| 446 Aeternitas || 1899 ER || Aeternitas, Roman god || 
|-id=447
| 447 Valentine || 1899 ES || Valentine, daughter of Baron Albert von Rothschild (1844–1911), benefactor || 
|-id=448
| 448 Natalie || 1899 ET || unknown origin of name || 
|-id=449
| 449 Hamburga || 1899 EU || The city of Hamburg, Germany || 
|-id=450
| 450 Brigitta || 1899 EV || unknown origin of name || 
|-id=451
| 451 Patientia || 1899 EY || Patientia, Latin for patience || 
|-id=452
| 452 Hamiltonia || 1899 FD || Mount Hamilton, California || 
|-id=453
| 453 Tea || 1900 FA || unknown origin of name || 
|-id=454
| 454 Mathesis || 1900 FC || Greek for (the act of) learning, chosen to mark the 300th anniversary of the Mathematische Gesellschaft in Hamburg founded in 1690 || 
|-id=455
| 455 Bruchsalia || 1900 FG || Bruchsal, Germany || 
|-id=456
| 456 Abnoba || 1900 FH || Abnoba, Celtic goddess || 
|-id=457
| 457 Alleghenia || 1900 FJ || Allegheny Observatory, Pennsylvania, United States || 
|-id=458
| 458 Hercynia || 1900 FK || Latin name for a forested region of Germany || 
|-id=459
| 459 Signe || 1900 FM || Signy, sister of Sigmund in Norse mythology || 
|-id=460
| 460 Scania || 1900 FN || Skåne (Scania), region of Sweden || 
|-id=461
| 461 Saskia || 1900 FP || Saskia van Uylenburgh (1612–1642), wife of Rembrandt || 
|-id=462
| 462 Eriphyla || 1900 FQ || Eriphyle, mythological Greek woman || 
|-id=463
| 463 Lola || 1900 FS || Lola, character in Cavalleria Rusticana, opera by Italian composer Pietro Mascagni (1863–1945) || 
|-id=464
| 464 Megaira || 1901 FV || Megaira, one of the Greek Erinyes (Furies) || 
|-id=465
| 465 Alekto || 1901 FW || Alecto, one of the Greek Erinyes (Furies) || 
|-id=466
| 466 Tisiphone || 1901 FX || Tisiphone, one of the Greek Erinyes (Furies) || 
|-id=467
| 467 Laura || 1901 FY || Laura, character in La Gioconda, opera by Italian composer Amilcare Ponchielli (1834–1886). Alternatively, it may have been named after the character in Sonnets to Laura by Petrarch (1304–1374) || 
|-id=468
| 468 Lina || 1901 FZ || Lina, a maidservant of the discoverer Max Wolf (1863–1932) || 
|-id=469
| 469 Argentina || 1901 GE || Argentina, country in South America || 
|-id=470
| 470 Kilia || 1901 GJ || Latin for Kiel, Germany || 
|-id=471
| 471 Papagena || 1901 GN || Papagena, a character in Mozart's opera The Magic Flute || 
|-id=472
| 472 Roma || 1901 GP || The city of Rome, Italy || 
|-id=473
| 473 Nolli || 1901 GC || Nolli is a nickname for a small child used in Max Wolf's family (discoverer) || 
|-id=474
| 474 Prudentia || 1901 GD || Prudentia, Roman allegorical figure || 
|-id=475
| 475 Ocllo || 1901 HN || Ocllo, Inca queen, named after the wife of one of the four sons of Pirua Wiracocha, creator god of civilization in Inca mythology || 
|-id=476
| 476 Hedwig || 1901 GQ || Hedwig, wife of Swedish–Danish astronomer Elis Strömgren (1870–1947) || 
|-id=477
| 477 Italia || 1901 GR || Italy, country || 
|-id=478
| 478 Tergeste || 1901 GU || Latin name for Trieste, Italy || 
|-id=479
| 479 Caprera || 1901 HJ || Caprera, island in Sardinia, Italy || 
|-id=480
| 480 Hansa || 1901 GL || The Hanseatic League, a medieval confederation of merchant guilds and market towns in Northwestern and Central Europe || 
|-id=481
| 481 Emita || 1902 HP || unknown origin of name || 
|-id=482
| 482 Petrina || 1902 HT || Feminine form of Petrus, Latin for Peter, one of the discoverer's dogs (Max Wolf) || 
|-id=483
| 483 Seppina || 1902 HU || Sepp, name of one of the discoverer's dogs (Max Wolf) || 
|-id=484
| 484 Pittsburghia || 1902 HX || Pittsburgh, Pennsylvania, United States || 
|-id=485
| 485 Genua || 1902 HZ || Latin name for the city of Genoa, in Liguria, Italy || 
|-id=486
| 486 Cremona || 1902 JB || The city of Cremona in Lombardy, Italy || 
|-id=487
| 487 Venetia || 1902 JL || The Italian Veneto region with its capital Venice || 
|-id=488
| 488 Kreusa || 1902 JG || Creusa, various Greek figures || 
|-id=489
| 489 Comacina || 1902 JM || Comacina, island in Lake Como, Italy || 
|-id=490
| 490 Veritas || 1902 JP || Veritas, Roman goddess || 
|-id=491
| 491 Carina || 1902 JQ || unknown origin of name || 
|-id=492
| 492 Gismonda || 1902 JR || Gismonda, a figure in The Decameron, a collection of novellas by Italian Giovanni Boccaccio (1313–1375). She is the daughter of Tancred, prince of Salerno. || 
|-id=493
| 493 Griseldis || 1902 JS || Griselda, folk tale heroine || 
|-id=494
| 494 Virtus || 1902 JV || Virtus, Roman deity || 
|-id=495
| 495 Eulalia || 1902 KG || The grandmother of the discoverer's wife (Max Wolf) || 
|-id=496
| 496 Gryphia || 1902 KH || Andreas Gryphius, German poet || 
|-id=497
| 497 Iva || 1902  || Iva Shores, daughter of the discoverer's landlord (Raymond Smith Dugan) || 
|-id=498
| 498 Tokio || 1902 KU || The city of Tokyo, Japan || 
|-id=499
| 499 Venusia || 1902 KX || Venusia, an alternative name for the Swedish island of Hven || 
|-id=500
| 500 Selinur || 1903 LA || Selinur, a character in the novel Auch Einer by German Friedrich Theodor Vischer (1807–1887) || 
|}

501–600 

|-
| 501 Urhixidur || 1903 LB || Urhixidur, character in the novel Auch Einer by German Friedrich Theodor Vischer (1807–1887) || 
|-id=502
| 502 Sigune || 1903 LC || Sigune, character in the novel Auch Einer by German Friedrich Theodor Vischer (1807–1887). The name may originate from Arthurian legend, where Sigune is the cousin of Parzival. || 
|-id=503
| 503 Evelyn || 1903 LF || Evelyn Smith Dugan, the discoverer's (Raymond Smith Dugan) mother || 
|-id=504
| 504 Cora || 1902 LK || Cora, from Inca mythology. She is the wife of one of the four sons of Pirua Wiracocha, creator god of Inca civilization. Also see . || 
|-id=505
| 505 Cava || 1902 LL || Mama Cava, Inca queen || 
|-id=506
| 506 Marion || 1903 LN || Marion Orcutt, cousin of American discoverer Raymond Smith Dugan (1878–1940) || 
|-id=507
| 507 Laodica || 1903 LO || Laodice from Greek mythology. She is the daughter of Hecuba and Trojan king Priam. || 
|-id=508
| 508 Princetonia || 1903 LQ || Princeton University, New Jersey, United States || 
|-id=509
| 509 Iolanda || 1903 LR || Unknown origin of name || 
|-id=510
| 510 Mabella || 1903 LT || Mabel Loomis Todd (1856–1932), American editor and writer. She is the daughter of the mathematician Elias Loomis, and the wife of astronomer David Peck Todd (see next entry). || 
|-id=511
| 511 Davida || 1903 LU || David Peck Todd (1855–1939), American astronomer and husband to Mabel Loomis Todd (see previous entry). || 
|-id=512
| 512 Taurinensis || 1903 LV || The city of Turin in northern Italy. Its Latin name is Taurinum. || 
|-id=513
| 513 Centesima || 1903 LY || Centesima, for the 100th discovery of an asteroid made by Max Wolf (1863–1932) || 
|-id=514
| 514 Armida || 1903 MB || Armida, fictional character in the epic poem Jerusalem Delivered by Italian baroque poet Torquato Tasso (1544–1595). The story of Armida and Rinaldo has also been the basis of several the operas including Armide by German bohemian Christoph Willibald Gluck (1714–1787), also see . || 
|-id=515
| 515 Athalia || 1903 ME || Athalia, Biblical queen of Judah (2 Kings ix) || 
|-id=516
| 516 Amherstia || 1903 MG || Amherst College in Massachusetts, United States, the alma mater of the discoverer Raymond Smith Dugan (1878–1940) || 
|-id=517
| 517 Edith || 1903 MH || Edith Dugan Eveleth, sister of American discoverer Raymond Smith Dugan || 
|-id=518
| 518 Halawe || 1903 MO || Halva (Halawe), a type of Arabic sweetmeat, a favourite of the discoverer Raymond Smith Dugan || 
|-id=519
| 519 Sylvania || 1903 MP || From "sylvan" (forest, wood), for the discoverer's (Raymond Smith Dugan) passion of tramping through the forests since he was a small boy || 
|-id=520
| 520 Franziska || 1903 MV || Unknown origin of name || 
|-id=521
| 521 Brixia || 1904 NB || The Italian city of Brescia (Brixia in Latin), birthplace of astronomer Emilio Bianchi, who computed the asteroid's orbit. || 
|-id=522
| 522 Helga || 1904 NC || ([H] only says "Named by Lt. Th. Lassen, orbit computer"; see AN 169, 363. Note that computer does not refer to a personal computer, i.e. a machine, but rather to a person actually doing the necessary calculations) || 
|-id=523
| 523 Ada || 1904 ND || Ada Helme, school friend and neighbour of the discoverer || 
|-id=524
| 524 Fidelio || 1904 NN || Leonora's pseudonym in Beethoven's only opera Fidelio || 
|-id=525
| 525 Adelaide || 1908 EKa || Queen Adelaide, consort to King William IV ([H] says nothing) This name was first borne by a Max Wolf discovery until it was identified as 1171 Rusthawelia; the name was then reassigned to this J. H. Metcalf discovery || 
|-id=526
| 526 Jena || 1904 NQ || Jena, Germany, on the occasion of a meeting of the Astronomische Gesellschaft there in 1905 (see AN 172, 287) || 
|-id=527
| 527 Euryanthe || 1904 NR || The main character in the opera Euryanthe by German composer Carl Maria von Weber (1786–1826) || 
|-id=528
| 528 Rezia || 1904 NS || Rezia, a character in the opera Oberon by Carl Maria von Weber (1786–1826) || 
|-id=529
| 529 Preziosa || 1904 NT || Character in the short story La Gitanilla by Miguel de Cervantes (1547–1616) || 
|-id=530
| 530 Turandot || 1904 NV || Turandot, character in the opera Turandot by Giacomo Puccini (1858–1924) || 
|-id=531
| 531 Zerlina || 1904 NW || Zerlina, character in the opera Don Giovanni by Mozart (1756–1791) || 
|-id=532
| 532 Herculina || 1904 NY || Feminine form of Hercules, Roman demigod ([H] simply says "named by Prof. Elia Millosevich, Observatory of the Collegio Romano" AN 167, 45) || 
|-id=533
| 533 Sara || 1904 NZ || Sara, a friend of the discoverer Raymond Smith Dugan (1878–1940) || 
|-id=534
| 534 Nassovia || 1904 OA || The Nassau Hall is the oldest building at Princeton University in New Jersey, United States. || 
|-id=535
| 535 Montague || 1904 OC || The town of Montague, Massachusetts, the birthplace of the American discoverer Raymond Smith Dugan (1878–1940) || 
|-id=536
| 536 Merapi || 1904 OF || Mount Merapi on the island of Sumatra, Indonesia, site of several expeditions to observe the solar eclipse of 17 May 1901 || 
|-id=537
| 537 Pauly || 1904 OG || Max Pauly, German businessman (manager of a sugar factory) and amateur optician whom Ernst Abbe appointed as head of the newly established Astronomy Division of Zeiss to design and produce telescope lenses; he ground the 10-inch lens of the Bruce double-astrograph, the "jewel" of the Heidelberg Observatory || 
|-id=538
| 538 Friederike || 1904 OK || Friederike, a friend of the discoverer Paul Götz (1883–1962) from Heidelberg, Germany || 
|-id=539
| 539 Pamina || 1904 OL || Pamina, a character in the opera The Magic Flute by Mozart (1756–1791) || 
|-id=540
| 540 Rosamunde || 1904 ON || The main character in the play Rosamunde by Helmina von Chézy, best remembered for its incidental music composed by Schubert (1797–1828) || 
|-id=541
| 541 Deborah || 1904 OO || Deborah, Biblical prophetess who helped to free the Israelites. She is mentioned in the Book of Judges. || 
|-id=542
| 542 Susanna || 1904 OQ || Susanna, a friend of the co-discoverer Paul Götz (1883–1962) from Heidelberg, Germany || 
|-id=543
| 543 Charlotte || 1904 OT || Charlotte, a friend of the discoverer Paul Götz (1883–1962) from Heidelberg, Germany || 
|-id=544
| 544 Jetta || 1904 OU || Jetta, a legendary German soothsayer. "Jettenbühl" is the site where Jetta was said to have lived and on which the medieval Heidelberg Castle was later built. || 
|-id=545
| 545 Messalina || 1904 OY || Messalina (c. 17/20–48), the third wife of Roman Emperor Claudius || 
|-id=546
| 546 Herodias || 1904 PA || Herodias (c. 15 BC — 39 AD), princess of the Herodian dynasty of Judaea during the time of the Roman Empire. She was a consort of Herod Antipas, the 1st-century ruler of Galilee and Perea. In the Gospels, Herodias plays a major role in the execution of John the Baptist. || 
|-id=547
| 547 Praxedis || 1904 PB || Praxedis, a character in the novel Ekkehard by German Joseph Victor von Scheffel (1826–1886) || 
|-id=548
| 548 Kressida || 1904 PC || Cressida, Trojan princess, character of Shakespeare's play Troilus and Cressida (based on the medieval legend of Troy, as opposed to the classical) || 
|-id=549
| 549 Jessonda || 1904 PK || Jessonda, a character in the opera Jessonda by German composer Louis Spohr (1784–1859) || 
|-id=550
| 550 Senta || 1904 PL || Senta, a character in the opera The Flying Dutchman by German composer Richard Wagner (1813–1883) || 
|-id=551
| 551 Ortrud || 1904 PM || Ortrud, a character in the opera Lohengrin by Richard Wagner, where she is the wife of Ferederick of Telramund. || 
|-id=552
| 552 Sigelinde || 1904 PO || Sigelinde, a character in the opera Die Walküre by Richard Wagner (1813–1883) || 
|-id=553
| 553 Kundry || 1904 PP || Kundry, a character in the opera Parsifal by Richard Wagner, who is both sorceress and mortal woman. The opera is based on the epic by Wolfram von Eschenbach. || 
|-id=554
| 554 Peraga || 1905 PS || The village of Vigonza (Peraga) in northern Italy, where the family of astronomer G. Abetti, who computed the asteroid's orbit, owned country villa. || 
|-id=555
| 555 Norma || 1905 PT || The main character in the opera Norma by Italian composer Vincenzo Bellini (1801–1835) || 
|-id=556
| 556 Phyllis || 1905 PW || Phyllis, from Greek mythology. The Thracian princess commits suicide when she realizes that her husband, king Demophon of Athens, will not return to her. || 
|-id=557
| 557 Violetta || 1905 PY || Violetta, the frivolous woman and leading character in the opera La Traviata by Giuseppe Verdi. The opera is based on the novel La Dame aux Camélias by Alexandre Dumas fils (1824–1895) || 
|-id=558
| 558 Carmen || 1905 QB || The main character in the opera Carmen by Frech composer Georges Bizet (1838–1875). The opera is based on the novella Carmen by Prosper Mérimée (1803–1870). || 
|-id=559
| 559 Nanon || 1905 QD || The operetta Nanon, die Wirtin vom Goldenen Lamm by German-Austrian composer Richard Genée (1823–1895) ||  
|-id=560
| 560 Delila || 1905 QF || Delilah, Biblical character, set to music by Saint-Saëns in his Samson et Dalila || 
|-id=561
| 561 Ingwelde || 1905 QG || Ingwelde, opera by Max von Schillings (?) ([H] simply says « German feminine first name ») || 
|-id=562
| 562 Salome || 1905 QH || Salomé, Biblical daughter of Herod the Great, character of Richard Strauss' opera Salome, in turn based on Oscar Wilde's Salomé play || 
|-id=563
| 563 Suleika || 1905 QK || Suleika, character in the philosophical novel Thus Spoke Zarathustra by Friedrich Nietzsche (1844–1900). Suleika and Dudu (see entry below) are mentioned in chapter "Among the Daughters of the Wilderness" (link) and are the novel's only feminine names. || 
|-id=564
| 564 Dudu || 1905 QM || Dudu, character in the philosophical novel Thus Spoke Zarathustra by Friedrich Nietzsche (1844–1900). Dudu and Suleika (see entry above) are mentioned in chapter "Among the Daughters of the Wilderness" (link) and are the novel's only feminine names. || 
|-id=565
| 565 Marbachia || 1905 QN || The town of Marbach in Hesse, Germany || 
|-id=566
| 566 Stereoskopia || 1905 QO || The Blink comparator, formerly known as "stereo-comparator", is an apparatus used to find differences between two photographs of the night sky by rapidly "blinking" back and forth between the two. In 1902, this asteroid was the first to be discovered by this method using photographic plates taken in 1899. The asteroid was named by the inventor of the Blink comparator, Carl Pulfrich (1858–1927). || 
|-id=567
| 567 Eleutheria || 1905 QP || Eleutheria, the goddess of liberty in Greek mythology. The counterpart of Eleutheria among the Roman gods is Libertas. || 
|-id=568
| 568 Cheruskia || 1905 QS || Cheruskia, student fraternity at Heidelberg University, named in turn after the Cherusci, an early German tribe || 
|-id=569
| 569 Misa || 1905 QT || |Misa, from Greek mythology. She is the mother of Dionysus (Bacchus) and a divinity in Orphism, a mystic religion from the ancient Greek and Hellenistic world. || 
|-id=570
| 570 Kythera || 1905 QX || Kythira, Greek island (First name in a long list published in 1914) ||  
|-id=571
| 571 Dulcinea || 1905 QZ || Dulcinea, a character in the novel Don Quixote by Miguel de Cervantes (1547–1616) || 
|-id=572
| 572 Rebekka || 1905 RB || Rebekka, a "bourgeois daughter" from Heidelberg, Germany. The name was given by the discoverer Paul Götz and may be inspired by the asteroid's provisional designation which contains the letters "RB". ||  
|-id=573
| 573 Recha || 1905 RC || Recha, a character in the play Nathan der Weise by Gotthold Ephraim Lessing (1729–1781). The name may be inspired by the asteroid's provisional designation which contains the letters "RC". || 
|-id=574
| 574 Reginhild || 1905 RD || Unknown origin of name. The choice for the German feminine first name may have been inspired by the asteroid's provisional designation, containing the letters "RD". || 
|-id=575
| 575 Renate || 1905 RE || Unknown origin of name; the name may be inspired by the asteroid's provisional designation, containing the letters "RE". || 
|-id=576
| 576 Emanuela || 1905 RF || Emanuela, a friend of the discoverer Paul Götz (1883–1962) || 
|-id=577
| 577 Rhea || 1905 RH || Rhea, from Greek mythology. She is a Titan of the first generation and known as "the mother of gods". The name may be inspired by the asteroid's provisional designation, containing the letters "RH". || 
|-id=578
| 578 Happelia || 1905 RZ || Carl Happel (1820–1914), a German painter and benefactor of the Heidelberg Observatory, where the Happel Laboratory is named after him. || 
|-id=579
| 579 Sidonia || 1905 SD || Sidonia, character in the epic poem Jerusalem Delivered by Italian baroque poet Torquato Tasso (1544–1595). The character has also been adopted in the opera Armide by German bohemian Christoph Willibald Gluck (1714–1787), which is based on the poem. Also see . The name Sidonia may be inspired by the asteroid's provisional designation, containing the letters "SD". || 
|-id=580
| 580 Selene || 1905 SE || Selene, lunar goddess from Greek mythology || 
|-id=581
| 581 Tauntonia || 1905 SH || The city of Taunton, Massachusetts, in the United States, where this asteroid was discovered by Joel Hastings Metcalf || 
|-id=582
| 582 Olympia || 1906 SO || Olympia, Greece || 
|-id=583
| 583 Klotilde || 1905 SP || Klotilde, daughter of Austrian astronomer Edmund Weiss (1837–1917), director of the Vienna Observatory where this asteroid was discovered by Johann Palisa. It was named by Klotilde's mother, Adelinde Weiss (née Fenzel); also see . || 
|-id=584
| 584 Semiramis || 1906 SY || Semiramis, Assyrian queen || 
|-id=585
| 585 Bilkis || 1906 TA || The Biblical Queen of Sheba who visited King Solomon. In the Qur'an, she is known as "Bilqis", "Balqis" or "Balkis". || 
|-id=586
| 586 Thekla || 1906 TC || Thecla (born 30 AD), a saint of the early Christian Church || 
|-id=587
| 587 Hypsipyle || 1906 TF || Hypsipyle, mythological Greek queen of Lemnos, mother of twins by Jason || 
|-id=588
| 588 Achilles || 1906 TG || Achilles, the greatest warrior in Greek mythology || 
|-id=589
| 589 Croatia || 1906 TM || The country of Croatia in southeastern Europe || 
|-id=590
| 590 Tomyris || 1906 TO || Tomyris, Scythian Queen of the Massagetae || 
|-id=591
| 591 Irmgard || 1906 TP || Unknown origin of name. Irmgard is a common feminine first name in German. || 
|-id=592
| 592 Bathseba || 1906 TS || Bathsheba, wife of Urias, mother of Solomon || 
|-id=593
| 593 Titania || 1906 TT || Titania, folkloric queen of the fairies (name inspired by the provisional designation letters: Titania) || 
|-id=594
| 594 Mireille || 1906 TW || Mirèio, a narrative poem by French poet Frédéric Mistral (1830–1914), the source of inspiration for the opera Mireille by the French composer Charles Gounod || 
|-id=595
| 595 Polyxena || 1906 TZ || Polyxena, from Greek mythology. The Trojan princess is the daughter of Priam and Hecuba. || 
|-id=596
| 596 Scheila || 1906 UA || An English student at the University of Heidelberg, a friend of the discoverer || 
|-id=597
| 597 Bandusia || 1906 UB || Spring of Bandusia, a fountain near Polezzo in Italy || 
|-id=598
| 598 Octavia || 1906 UC || Octavia the Younger (c. 66 BC–11 BC), sister of Augustus || 
|-id=599
| 599 Luisa || 1906 UJ || Unknown origin of name || 
|-id=600
| 600 Musa || 1906 UM || The Muses, the nine inspirational goddesses of poetry, science, and the arts in Greek mythology || 
|}

601–700 

|-
| 601 Nerthus || 1906 UN || Nerthus, Germanic/Scandinavian Earth Mother goddess || 
|-id=602
| 602 Marianna || 1906 TE || Unknown origin of name || 
|-id=603
| 603 Timandra || 1906 TJ || Timandra, mythological Greek woman, sister of Helen of Troy, mother of Evander || 
|-id=604
| 604 Tekmessa || 1906 TK || Tecmessa, mythological Greek woman, daughter of the Phrygian prince Teubrantes, captive of Ajax, by whom she had a son, Eurysaces || 
|-id=605
| 605 Juvisia || 1906 UU || The city of Juvisy-sur-Orge, France, location of the Camille Flammarion Observatory || 
|-id=606
| 606 Brangäne || 1906 VB || Brangäne, character in the opera Tristan und Isolde by Richard Wagner. She is a maid servant of Isolda. || 
|-id=607
| 607 Jenny || 1906 VC || Jenny Adolfine Kessler, friend of the discoverer August Kopff, on the occasion of her engagement (also see next entry) || 
|-id=608
| 608 Adolfine || 1906 VD || Jenny Adolfine Kessler, friend of the discoverer August Kopff, on the occasion of her engagement (also see previous entry) || 
|-id=609
| 609 Fulvia || 1906 VF || Fulvia (c. 83 BC – 40 BC),  aristocratic Roman woman and wife of Mark Antony || 
|-id=610
| 610 Valeska || 1906 VK || Unknown origin of name. The choice for this name may have been inspired by the asteroid's provisional designation, containing the letters "VK". || 
|-id=611
| 611 Valeria || 1906 VL || Unknown origin of name. The choice for this name may have been inspired by the asteroid's provisional designation, containing the letters "VL" || 
|-id=612
| 612 Veronika || 1906 VN || Unknown origin of name. The choice for this name may have been inspired by the asteroid's provisional designation, containing the letters "VN" || 
|-id=613
| 613 Ginevra || 1906 VP || Guinevere, wife of King Arthur from Arthurian legend (possibly) || 
|-id=614
| 614 Pia || 1906 VQ || Pia Observatory, in Trieste, Italy, the private observatory of Johann Nepomuk Krieger (1865–1902), German amateur astronomer and selenographer || 
|-id=615
| 615 Roswitha || 1906 VR || Hrotsvitha of Gandersheim (c. 935–973), German poet || 
|-id=616
| 616 Elly || 1906 VT || Elly Boehm, wife of German mathematician Karl Boehm (1873–1958; bio-de) || 
|-id=617
| 617 Patroclus || 1906 VY || Patroclus, warrior from Greek mythology, close friend of Achilles and killed by Hector. The satellite of this Jupiter trojan, (617) Patroclus I Menoetius, was named after Menoetius, father of Patroclus. || 
|-id=618
| 618 Elfriede || 1906 VZ || Unknown origin of name || 
|-id=619
| 619 Triberga || 1906 WC || The town of Triberg im Schwarzwald, southern Germany || 
|-id=620
| 620 Drakonia || 1906 WE || Drake University, Iowa, US, where the orbit computers worked || 
|-id=621
| 621 Werdandi || 1906 WJ || Verdandi, one of the Norns in Norse mythology || 
|-id=622
| 622 Esther || 1906 WP || Esther, Biblical heroine described in the Book of Esther as a Jewish queen of the Persian king Ahasuerus || 
|-id=623
| 623 Chimaera || 1907 XJ || Mount Chimaera of Lycia, inspiration for the Chimera, mythological Greek monster || 
|-id=624
| 624 Hektor || 1907 XM || Hector, Trojan hero from Greek mythology || 
|-id=625
| 625 Xenia || 1907 XN || Unknown origin of name. The choice for this name may have been inspired by the asteroid's provisional designation, containing the letters "XN" || 
|-id=626
| 626 Notburga || 1907 XO || Saint Notburga (c. 1265–1313), holy character of the Neckar valley, the discovery site || 
|-id=627
| 627 Charis || 1907 XS || Charis, one of the Charites (Graces), the goddesses of charm, beauty, creativity, and fertility in Greek mythology. They are the daughters of Zeus and Eurynome and include Euphrosyne, Thalia and Aglaea (Aglaja). || 
|-id=628
| 628 Christine || 1907 XT || Unknown origin of name || 
|-id=629
| 629 Bernardina || 1907 XU || Unknown origin of name || 
|-id=630
| 630 Euphemia || 1907 XW || Saint Euphemia (died 303 AD), whose feast day is September 16. The name also means a good omen. || 
|-id=631
| 631 Philippina || 1907 YJ || Philipp Kessler, friend of the discoverer, on the occasion of his engagement. He is a friend of the astronomer August Kopff who discovered this asteroid (see also 634). || 
|-id=632
| 632 Pyrrha || 1907 YX || Pyrrha, wife of Deukalion, Greek mythological woman || 
|-id=633
| 633 Zelima || 1907 ZM || Unknown origin of name. The choice for this name may have been inspired by the asteroid's provisional designation, containing the letters "ZM" || 
|-id=634
| 634 Ute || 1907 ZN || Ute Kessler, on the occasion of her engagement. She is a friend of the astronomer August Kopff who discovered this asteroid (see also 631). || 
|-id=635
| 635 Vundtia || 1907 ZS || Wilhelm Wundt (1832–1920), German psychologist || 
|-id=636
| 636 Erika || 1907 XP || Unknown origin of name || 
|-id=637
| 637 Chrysothemis || 1907 YE || Chrysothemis, mythological daughter of Agamemnon, character in Sophocles' Electra || 
|-id=638
| 638 Moira || 1907 ZQ || Moirai (Moira), Greek goddess of fate || 
|-id=639
| 639 Latona || 1907 ZT || Roman goddess Latona, daughter of Ceo Titan, loved by Jupiter, and mother of Apollo and Diana || 
|-id=640
| 640 Brambilla || 1907 ZW || Prinzessin Brambilla, novel written by E. T. A. Hoffmann (1776–1822), and set to music by Walter Braunfels (1882–1954) || 
|-id=641
| 641 Agnes || 1907 ZX || Unknown origin of name || 
|-id=642
| 642 Clara || 1907 ZY || Clara, one of the discoverer's housekeepers (Max Wolf) || 
|-id=643
| 643 Scheherezade || 1907 ZZ || Scheherazade, legendary Arabic storyteller in 1001 Nights || 
|-id=644
| 644 Cosima || 1907 AA || Cosima Wagner (1837–1930), daughter of Hungarian pianist and composer Franz Liszt, and second wife of German composer Richard Wagner || 
|-id=645
| 645 Agrippina || 1907 AG || Agrippina the Elder (14 BC–33) and her daughter Agrippina the Younger (15–59), two Roman noblewomen. Former was the wife of general Germanicus and mother of Emperor Caligula, while the latter was the mother of Emperor Nero. || 
|-id=646
| 646 Kastalia || 1907 AC || Castalia, Greek nymph whom Apollo transformed into a fountain at Delphi, at the base of Mount Parnassos || 
|-id=647
| 647 Adelgunde || 1907 AD || Unknown origin of name || 
|-id=648
| 648 Pippa || 1907 AE || Pippa, main character in the novel And Pippa Dances by German writer Gerhardt Hauptmann (1862–1946) || 
|-id=649
| 649 Josefa || 1907 AF || Unknown origin of name. A feminine first name in German. || 
|-id=650
| 650 Amalasuntha || 1907 AM || Amalasuntha, Ostrogoth queen, daughter of Theoderich || 
|-id=651
| 651 Antikleia || 1907 AN || Anticlea, from Greek mythology. She is the wife of Laertes and mother of Odysseus. || 
|-id=652
| 652 Jubilatrix || 1907 AU || The 60-year jubilee of Emperor Franz Joseph of Austria, during which this minor planet was discovered || 
|-id=653
| 653 Berenike || 1907 BK || Berenice II of Egypt (c. 267–221 BC), queen of Cyrene and Egypt || 
|-id=654
| 654 Zelinda || 1908 BM || Zelinda Dini, sister of Italian mathematician Ulisse Dini (1845–1918). The name was proposed by astronomer Elia Millosevich, a good friend of Dini. || 
|-id=655
| 655 Briseïs || 1907 BF || Briseis, mythological Trojan slave || 
|-id=656
| 656 Beagle || 1908 BU || HMS Beagle, Darwin's ship || 
|-id=657
| 657 Gunlöd || 1908 BV || Gunnlod, mythological Norse giantess || 
|-id=658
| 658 Asteria || 1908 BW || Asteria, various Greek figures || 
|-id=659
| 659 Nestor || 1908 CS || Nestor, mythological Greek king || 
|-id=660
| 660 Crescentia || 1908 CC || Heroine of a German legend, a variant of the Genevieve of Brabant medieval story, found in the Historie von der geduldigen Konigin Crescentia, itself based on a 12th-century poem in the Kaiserchronik || 
|-id=661
| 661 Cloelia || 1908 CL || Cloelia, legendary Roman woman || 
|-id=662
| 662 Newtonia || 1908 CW || previously believed to refer to Isaac Newton, British physicist; but later correctly identified as being named after Newton, Massachusetts (Isaac Newton is now honored by asteroid ) || 
|-id=663
| 663 Gerlinde || 1908 DG || Unknown origin of name || 
|-id=664
| 664 Judith || 1908 DH || Biblical heroine dramatised in Friedrich Hebbel's play Judith || 
|-id=665
| 665 Sabine || 1908 DK || Unknown origin of name. || 
|-id=666
| 666 Desdemona || 1908 DM || Desdemona, character in Shakespeare's Othello. The name may have been inspired by the asteroid's provisional designation, containing the letters "DM". || 
|-id=667
| 667 Denise || 1908 DN || Unknown origin of name. The choice for this name may have been inspired by the asteroid's provisional designation, containing the letters "DN". || 
|-id=668
| 668 Dora || 1908 DO || Dora, a friend of the wife of astronomer August Kopff, who discovered this asteroid. The name may have been inspired by the asteroid's provisional designation, containing the letters "DO". || 
|-id=669
| 669 Kypria || 1908 DQ || Kypria, poem sometimes attributed to Homer, which serves as an introduction to the Iliad || 
|-id=670
| 670 Ottegebe || 1908 DR || Character in Gerhardt Hauptmann's play Der arme Heinrich || 
|-id=671
| 671 Carnegia || 1908 DV || The Carnegie Institution of Washington, DC, founded by Andrew Carnegie, Scottish-born American businessman and philanthropist || 
|-id=672
| 672 Astarte || 1908 DY || 'Ashtart, Phoenician goddess of love and fertility || 
|-id=673
| 673 Edda || 1908 EA || The Norse Edda, a collection of myths || 
|-id=674
| 674 Rachele || 1908 EP || Wife of Italian astronomer Emilio Bianchi, the orbit computer || 
|-id=675
| 675 Ludmilla || 1908 DU || Character in the opera Ruslan and Lyudmila by Russian composer Mikhail Glinka (1804–1857) || 
|-id=676
| 676 Melitta || 1909 FN || Attic form of the Greek name Melissa, nymph changed into a bee (and also an allusion to the discoverer's name, Melotte) || 
|-id=677
| 677 Aaltje || 1909 FR || Aaltje Noordewier–Reddingius (1868–1949), a Dutch classical soprano || 
|-id=678
| 678 Fredegundis || 1909 FS || Fredegundis, an opera based on the life of Fredegund (a.k.a. Fredegunda, Fredegundis, Fredigundis, Frédégonde, Queen consort of Chilperic I, the Merovingian Frankish king of Soissons), begun by the French composer Ernest Guirand and completed by Saint-Saëns || 
|-id=679
| 679 Pax || 1909 FY || Pax, Roman goddess of peace. Her Greek equivalent is Eirene. || 
|-id=680
| 680 Genoveva || 1909 GW || Main character in Friedrich Hebbel's play Genoveva || 
|-id=681
| 681 Gorgo || 1909 GZ || Gorgon one of the three sisters – Euryale, Stheno, and Medusa – who had hair made of living, venomous snakes and a gaze that could turn one to stone. Paul Herget reports that Ingrid van Houten-Groeneveld and  thought the name refers to Gorgo (a.k.a. Gorgos, Gorgus), King of Salamine (Salamis, Cyprus) in the 5th century B.C., who accompanied Xerxes in Greece. || 
|-id=682
| 682 Hagar || 1909 HA || Hagar, Biblical woman in the Book of Genesis || 
|-id=683
| 683 Lanzia || 1909 HC || Karl Lanz (1873–1921; bio-de), a German mechanical engineer and industrialist who provided the funds for the re-establishment of the Heidelberg Academy of Sciences and Humanities || 
|-id=684
| 684 Hildburg || 1909 HD || Unknown origin of name. The choice for this German feminine first name may have been inspired by the asteroid's provisional designation, containing the letters "HD". || 
|-id=685
| 685 Hermia || 1909 HE || Unknown origin of name || 
|-id=686
| 686 Gersuind || 1909 HF || Main character in the play Gersuind by Gerhart Hauptmann || 
|-id=687
| 687 Tinette || 1909 HG || Unknown origin of name || 
|-id=688
| 688 Melanie || 1909 HH || Unknown origin of name || 
|-id=689
| 689 Zita || 1909 HJ || Princess Zita of Bourbon-Parma, wife of Emperor Charles I of Austria || 
|-id=690
| 690 Wratislavia || 1909 HZ || Latin for Breslau (Wrocław), now in Poland || 
|-id=691
| 691 Lehigh || 1909 JG || Lehigh University, US, where the computer (J. B. Reynolds) was || 
|-id=692
| 692 Hippodamia || 1901 HD || Hippodamia, queen of Pisa from Greek mythology. She is the wife of Pelops and ancestor to king Agamemnon. The choice for this name may have been inspired by the asteroid's provisional designation, containing the letters "HD". || 
|-id=693
| 693 Zerbinetta || 1909 HN || Character in Richard Strauss' opera Ariadne auf Naxos || 
|-id=694
| 694 Ekard || 1909 JA || Drake University, US ('Drake' backwards), where the orbit computers (S. B. Nicholson and his wife) were || 
|-id=695
| 695 Bella || 1909 JB || Unknown origin of name || 
|-id=696
| 696 Leonora || 1910 JJ || Mary Leonora Snow, wife of the orbit computer, Arthur Snow || 
|-id=697
| 697 Galilea || 1910 JO || Galileo Galilei (1564–1642), on the occasion of the 300th anniversary of his discovery of the Galilean moons || 
|-id=698
| 698 Ernestina || 1910 JX || Ernst Wolf, son of the discoverer Max Wolf (1863–1932) || 
|-id=699
| 699 Hela || 1910 KD || Hel, Norse goddess of the dead || 
|-id=700
| 700 Auravictrix || 1910 KE || Latin for 'victory against the wind' (named for the first Schütte-Lanz Zeppelin flights in 1911) || 
|}

701–800 

|-
| 701 Oriola || 1910 KN || The Old World golden oriole, Oriolus oriolus || 
|-id=702
| 702 Alauda || 1910 KQ || The bird genus Alauda (larks) || 
|-id=703
| 703 Noëmi || 1910 KT || Valentine Noëmi von Rothschild, wife of Baron Sigismund von Springer (presumed). Alternatively, Noemi is a Biblical heroine from the Book of Ruth (unsourced) || 
|-id=704
| 704 Interamnia || 1910 KU || Latin for city of Terni (Teramo) in Italy, birthplace of the discoverer Vincenzo Cerulli. Several Roman towns were called Interamnia, meaning "in between two rivers". || 
|-id=705
| 705 Erminia || 1910 KV || The comic operetta Erminie, by Edward Jacobowsky || 
|-id=706
| 706 Hirundo || 1910 KX || The bird genus Hirundo (swallows) || 
|-id=707
| 707 Steina || 1910 LD || Mr. Stein, a benefactor of the Breslau Observatory  in former German Empire, now Poland || 
|-id=708
| 708 Raphaela || 1911 LJ || Raphaël Bischoffsheim (1823–1906), French banker and philanthropist, founder of the Nice Observatory || 
|-id=709
| 709 Fringilla || 1911 LK || The bird genus Fringilla (finches) || 
|-id=710
| 710 Gertrud || 1911 LM || Gertrud Rheden, daughter of Austrian astronomer Joseph Rheden and granddaughter of the discoverer Johann Palisa || 
|-id=711
| 711 Marmulla || 1911 LN || Marble, the small spherical toy. The name is possibly derived from the German medieval word "Marmul", according to astronomer Paul Wild. The asteroid's name was originally spelt "Marmula". || 
|-id=712
| 712 Boliviana || 1911 LO || Simón Bolívar (1783–1830), South American revolutionary || 
|-id=713
| 713 Luscinia || 1911 LS || The bird genus Luscinia (nightingales) || 
|-id=714
| 714 Ulula || 1911 LW || The bird genus Ulula (owls) || 
|-id=715
| 715 Transvaalia || 1911 LX || The province of Transvaal in South Africa. This is the first numbered minor planet discovered in Africa. || 
|-id=716
| 716 Berkeley || 1911 MD || University of California in Berkeley || 
|-id=717
| 717 Wisibada || 1911 MJ || The German city of Wiesbaden, birthplace of the discoverer Franz Kaiser (1891–1962) || 
|-id=718
| 718 Erida || 1911 MS || Erida, daughter of American astronomer Armin Otto Leuschner (1868–1953) || 
|-id=719
| 719 Albert || 1911 MT || Baron Albert Salomon von Rothschild (1844–1911), benefactor of the Vienna Observatory || 
|-id=720
| 720 Bohlinia || 1911 MW || Karl Petrus Theodor Bohlin (1860–1939), Swedish astronomer, who studied Jupiter's perturbations. The name was given on the occasion of his 65th birthday. || 
|-id=721
| 721 Tabora || 1911 MZ || The Tabora, an ocean liner visited during an astronomical conference || 
|-id=722
| 722 Frieda || 1911 NA || Frieda, the daughter of Austrian astronomer Karl Hillebrand (1861–1939; bio-de) || 
|-id=723
| 723 Hammonia || 1911 NB || Hamburg, Germany || 
|-id=724
| 724 Hapag || 1911 NC || The Hamburg America Line (HAPAG), after the shipping line || 
|-id=725
| 725 Amanda || 1911 ND || Amanda Schorr, wife of German astronomer Richard Schorr, see  || 
|-id=726
| 726 Joëlla || 1911 NM || Feminine form of Joël, for Joel Hastings Metcalf, American Unitarian minister and astronomer || 
|-id=727
| 727 Nipponia || 1912 NT || Japan, where the minor planet was accidentally discovered twice (1900 FE; 1908 CV) by Shin Hirayama || 
|-id=728
| 728 Leonisis || 1912 NU || Leo Gans (1843–1935; bio-de), German chemist and president of the Physical Society at Frankfurt, named on the occasion of his 70th birthday. The Society's emblem shows the goddess Isis, and contributed to the ending of the asteroid's name. || 
|-id=729
| 729 Watsonia || 1912 OD || James Craig Watson (1838–1880), Canadian-American astronomer || 
|-id=730
| 730 Athanasia || 1912 OK || Greek for immortality || 
|-id=731
| 731 Sorga || 1912 OQ || Surga, Indonesian for "heavens" || 
|-id=732
| 732 Tjilaki || 1912 OR || Tjilaki (Cilaki) river and village near Malabar, Indonesia || 
|-id=733
| 733 Mocia || 1912 PF || Werner "Mok" Wolf, son of the German discoverer Max Wolf || 
|-id=734
| 734 Benda || 1912 PH || Anna Benda, wife of Austrian discoverer Johann Palisa. (In some publications the name has been erroneously attributed to Czech composer Karel Bendl, 1838–1897) || 
|-id=735
| 735 Marghanna || 1912 PY || Margarete Vogt, mother of German discoverer Heinrich Vogt; and Hanna, a relative of his || 
|-id=736
| 736 Harvard || 1912 PZ || Harvard University, US || 
|-id=737
| 737 Arequipa || 1912 QB || Arequipa, Peru, where Harvard University had an observing station || 
|-id=738
| 738 Alagasta || 1913 QO || Original name of the German city Gau-Algesheim (Gaualgesheim), native city of discoverer's family (Franz Kaiser) || 
|-id=739
| 739 Mandeville || 1913 QR || Mandeville, Jamaica || 
|-id=740
| 740 Cantabia || 1913 QS || Contraction of Cantabrigia, Latin for Cambridge, named in honour of Cambridge, Massachusetts and its Harvard University || 
|-id=741
| 741 Botolphia || 1913 QT || Saint Botolph, 7th-century founder of the monastery that would become Boston, Lincolnshire, England || 
|-id=742
| 742 Edisona || 1913 QU || Thomas Edison, American inventor || 
|-id=743
| 743 Eugenisis || 1913 QV || Eugenisis, for "good creation" (composed Greek word: "eu" for good, well and "genesis" for creation). It was named by the discoverer Franz Kaiser for the birth of his daughter. || 
|-id=744
| 744 Aguntina || 1913 QW || Aguntum, the ancient Roman settlement in the province of Noricum, near the Austrian town of Lienz, Tyrol, the birthplace of the discoverer Adam Massinger (1888–1914) || 
|-id=745
| 745 Mauritia || 1913 QX || Saint Maurice (Saint Mauritius), patron saint of a church in Wiesbaden, Germany || 
|-id=746
| 746 Marlu || 1913 QY || Marie-Louise Kaiser, a German physician and daughter of the discoverer Franz Kaiser || 
|-id=747
| 747 Winchester || 1913 QZ || Winchester, Massachusetts, United States, location of the Taunton Observatory where this asteroid was discovered by Joel Hastings Metcalf || 
|-id=748
| 748 Simeïsa || 1913 RD || Simeïs Observatory, Crimea, Ukraine, the discovery site || 
|-id=749
| 749 Malzovia || 1913 RF || Nikolai Sergeevich Maltsov (S. I. Maltsov), Russian amateur astronomer, founder of Simeïs Observatory || 
|-id=750
| 750 Oskar || 1913 RG || Oskar Ruben von Rothschild (1888–1909), the youngest son of Albert Salomon Anselm von Rothschild || 
|-id=751
| 751 Faïna || 1913 RK || Faina Mikhajlovna Neujmina, colleague and first wife of the discoverer Grigory Neujmin (1886–1946) || 
|-id=752
| 752 Sulamitis || 1913 RL || Sulamith, Biblical woman identified with the Queen of Sheba || 
|-id=753
| 753 Tiflis || 1913 RM || The city of Tbilisi in Georgia, birthplace of the discoverer Grigory Neujmin (1886–1946) || 
|-id=754
| 754 Malabar || 1906 UT || Malabar, Java, Indonesia, commemorating the Dutch-German solar eclipse expedition of 1922 to Christmas Island || 
|-id=755
| 755 Quintilla || 1908 CZ || Quintilla, feminine Italian first name, chosen because no other planet had a name beginning with Q so far. || 
|-id=756
| 756 Lilliana || 1908 DC || Lillian, sister of American astronomer Harlow Shapley (1885–1972) || 
|-id=757
| 757 Portlandia || 1908 EJ || The city of Portland in Maine, United States, where the discoverer, Joel Hastings Metcalf (1866–1925), was a church minister at the time of his death || 
|-id=758
| 758 Mancunia || 1912 PE || The city of Manchester, United Kingdom (by its Latin name "Mancunia"), native city of the discoverer, Harry Edwin Wood (1881–1946) || 
|-id=759
| 759 Vinifera || 1913 SJ || Vitis vinifera, the wine grape, former means of livelihood of the discoverer's ancestors || 
|-id=760
| 760 Massinga || 1913 SL || Adam Massinger (1888–1914), a German astronomer and discoverer of minor planets at Heidelberg Observatory who was killed in World War I (Src) || 
|-id=761
| 761 Brendelia || 1913 SO || Martin Brendel (1862–1939), German astronomer, director of the International Planet Institute, who chose this minor planet amongst Kaiser's unnamed discoveries for its small orbital inclination || 
|-id=762
| 762 Pulcova || 1913 SQ || Pulkovo Heights, hills near St. Petersburg, site of the oldest Russian observatory, Pulkovo Observatory || 
|-id=763
| 763 Cupido || 1913 ST || Cupid, Roman god, because of the minor planet's relative closeness to the Sun || 
|-id=764
| 764 Gedania || 1913 SU || The city of Gdańsk, Poland (formerly Free City of Danzig) where the discoverer, Franz Kaiser (1891–1962), was an assistant at the observatory during the early 1920s. || 
|-id=765
| 765 Mattiaca || 1913 SV || The city of Wiesbaden in Germany (by its Latin name "Mattiacum"), home town of discoverer Franz Kaiser (1891–1962) || 
|-id=766
| 766 Moguntia || 1913 SW || The city of Mainz in Germany (by its Latin name "Moguntia"), where the discoverer, Franz Kaiser, taught at city's Johannes Gutenberg University || 
|-id=767
| 767 Bondia || 1913 SX || William Cranch Bond (1789–1859) and his son George Phillips Bond (1825–1865), both American astronomers and directors of the Harvard College Observatory in Cambridge, Massachusetts. || 
|-id=768
| 768 Struveana || 1913 SZ || Friedrich Georg Wilhelm Struve (1793–1864), Otto Wilhelm Struve (1819–1905) and Hermann Struve (1854–1920), Russo-German astronomers, known for their double star studies and directors of the Pulkovo and Berlin Observatory observatories, respectively. || 
|-id=769
| 769 Tatjana || 1913 TA || Tatjana, a colleague of the discover Grigory Neujmin at Pulkovo Observatory in Saint Petersburg, Russia. Alternatively, "Tatjana" may refer to the heroine in the novel Eugene Onegin by Aleksandr Pushkin. || 
|-id=770
| 770 Bali || 1913 TE || Mahabali (Bali), King of the Daityas in the Hindu Puranas || 
|-id=771
| 771 Libera || 1913 TO || A friend of the discoverer (the minor planet was named by his widow) || 
|-id=772
| 772 Tanete || 1913 TR || The city of Tanete on the island of Sulawesi in Indonesia || 
|-id=773
| 773 Irmintraud || 1913 TV || Feminine German first name, common in old myths and legends || 
|-id=774
| 774 Armor || 1913 TW || Armorica, Celtic name for Northwest France (Brittany and Normandy) || 
|-id=775
| 775 Lumière || 1914 TX || The brothers Auguste and Louis Lumière (1862–1954; 1864–1948), French physicists and pioneers of photography and cinematography || 
|-id=776
| 776 Berbericia || 1914 TY || Adolf Berberich (1861–1920), German astronomer || 
|-id=777
| 777 Gutemberga || 1914 TZ || Johannes Gutenberg (c. 1400–1468), printing pioneer || 
|-id=778
| 778 Theobalda || 1914 UA || Theobald Kaiser, father of German discoverer Franz Kaiser (1891–1962) || 
|-id=779
| 779 Nina || 1914 UB || Nina Nikolaevna Neujmina (1877–1956), mathematician and sister of Russian discoverer Grigory Neujmin || 
|-id=780
| 780 Armenia || 1914 UC || The country of Armenia in the South Caucasus || 
|-id=781
| 781 Kartvelia || 1914 UF || Kartveli, Georgian name for the Georgian people || 
|-id=782
| 782 Montefiore || 1914 UK || Clarice Sebag-Montefiore, wife of Alphonse Mayer Rothschild (1878–1942), the second son of Baron Albert von Rothschild || 
|-id=783
| 783 Nora || 1914 UL || Nora, heroine in the play A Doll's House by Norwegian writer Henrik Ibsen (1828–1906) || 
|-id=784
| 784 Pickeringia || 1914 UM || Edward Charles Pickering (1846–1919) and his brother William Henry Pickering (1858–1938), both American astronomers || 
|-id=785
| 785 Zwetana || 1914 UN || Tsvetana Popova, daughter of professor Kyrille Popoff (also Popoff or Pophoff) of Sofia, Bulgaria || 
|-id=786
| 786 Bredichina || 1914 UO || Fyodor Bredikhin (1831–1904), Russian astronomer || 
|-id=787
| 787 Moskva || 1914 UQ || The city of Moscow in Russia || 
|-id=788
| 788 Hohensteina || 1914 UR || Hohnstein Castle near Bad Schwalbach in Hesse, Germany, hometown of the wife of the discoverer, Franz Kaiser (1891–1962). Her ancestors derive from the castle's Order of Knighthood, "Breder von Hohenstein". || 
|-id=789
| 789 Lena || 1914 UU || Elena Petrovna Neujmina (1860–1942), mother of the discoverer Grigory Neujmin. || 
|-id=790
| 790 Pretoria || 1912 NW || The city of Pretoria in South Africa || 
|-id=791
| 791 Ani || 1914 UV || Ani, ruined city in Armenia || 
|-id=792
| 792 Metcalfia || 1907 ZC || Joel Hastings Metcalf (1866–1925), American Unitarian minister and astronomer || 
|-id=793
| 793 Arizona || 1907 ZD || The U.S. state of Arizona, where the Lowell Observatory is located in Flagstaff || 
|-id=794
| 794 Irenaea || 1914 VB || Irene Hillebrand, née Weiss, daughter of Austrian astronomer Edmund Weiss (1837–1917), director of the Vienna Observatory. The name's aea-suffix was needed to avoid conflict with asteroid 14 Irene. || 
|-id=795
| 795 Fini || 1914 VE || Unknown origin of name. Fini is an Austrian diminutive of Josephine. || 
|-id=796
| 796 Sarita || 1914 VH || Unknown origin of name || 
|-id=797
| 797 Montana || 1914 VR || From mons, the Latin for mountain, in honour of Hamburg Observatory, located at Bergedorf, in Germany. It was the observatory's first minor-planet discovery || 
|-id=798
| 798 Ruth || 1914 VT || Ruth, Biblical heroine in the Old Testament || 
|-id=799
| 799 Gudula || 1915 WO || Gudula, German feminine first name, from the calendar  || 
|-id=800
| 800 Kressmannia || 1915 WP || Major A. Kressmann (or Kreßmann), benefactor who donated the 318-mm Kressmann Refractor to the Heidelberg Observatory, Germany. The telescope was used for Double Star measurements and was hosted in the dome of Heidelberg's Ostinstitut until 1978, when it was replaced by the 50-centimeter telescope (Src). || 
|}

801–900 

|-
| 801 Helwerthia || 1915 WQ || Elise Helwerth–Wolf (1840–1924), mother of the discoverer Max Wolf; also see  || 
|-id=802
| 802 Epyaxa || 1915 WR || Epyaxa, queen of Syennesis, wife to King of Cilicia in South Asia Minor in the 5th century BCE || 
|-id=803
| 803 Picka || 1915 WS || Friedrich Pick (1867–1921), a Czech physician from Prague who first introduced endoscopy in medicine || 
|-id=804
| 804 Hispania || 1915 WT || The country of Spain, named by its Latin name, Hispania. It was the first discovery of an asteroid ever made in Spain. || 
|-id=805
| 805 Hormuthia || 1915 WW || Hormuth Kopff, wife of German astronomer August Kopff, assistant to the discoverer, Max Wolf. || 
|-id=806
| 806 Gyldénia || 1915 WX || Hugo Gyldén (1841–1896), Swedish astronomer at Stockholm Observatory || 
|-id=807
| 807 Ceraskia || 1915 WY || Vitold Tserasky (1849–1925), also known as Vitold Cerasky or Vitol'd Karlovic Tseraskiy, a Russian astronomer and director at the Moscow Observatory . The lunar crater Tseraskiy is named after him. His wife, Lidiya Tseraskaya was also an astronomer. || 
|-id=808
| 808 Merxia || 1901 GY || Adalbert Merx, the father-in-law of Max Wolf. The discovery was made by his assistant Luigi Carnera at Heidelberg. || 
|-id=809
| 809 Lundia || 1915 XP || Lund Observatory, located in Lund, southern Sweden || 
|-id=810
| 810 Atossa || 1915 XQ || Atossa (550–475 BC), ancient Persian queen, daughter of Cyrus, wife of Darius || 
|-id=811
| 811 Nauheima || 1915 XR || The town of Bad Nauheim in Hesse, Germany || 
|-id=812
| 812 Adele || 1915 XV || Adele, character in the operetta Die Fledermaus by Johann Strauss (1825–1899) || 
|-id=813
| 813 Baumeia || 1915 YR || "H. Baum", a German student of astronomy at Heidelberg University who died in World War I || 
|-id=814
| 814 Tauris || 1916 YT || Tauris, ancient name of the Crimean peninsula (Schmadel says "Tauric Mount", but there is no such mountain) || 
|-id=815
| 815 Coppelia || 1916 YU || The comic ballet Coppélia by composer Léo Delibes (1836–1891) based upon a story by E. T. A. Hoffmann (1776–1822) || 
|-id=816
| 816 Juliana || 1916 YV || Queen Juliana of the Netherlands (1909–2004) || 
|-id=817
| 817 Annika || 1916 YW || Unknown origin of name || 
|-id=818
| 818 Kapteynia || 1916 YZ || Jacobus Kapteyn (1851–1922), Dutch astronomer || 
|-id=819
| 819 Barnardiana || 1916 ZA || Edward Emerson Barnard (1857–1923), American astronomer || 
|-id=820
| 820 Adriana || 1916 ZB || Unknown origin of name || 
|-id=821
| 821 Fanny || 1916 ZC || Unknown origin of name || 
|-id=822
| 822 Lalage || 1916 ZD || Unknown origin of name || 
|-id=823
| 823 Sisigambis || 1916 ZG || Sisygambis (died 323 BC), mother of Darius III of Persia || 
|-id=824
| 824 Anastasia || 1916 ZH || Anastasia Semenoff, an acquaintance of Russian discoverer Grigory Neujmin (1886–1946) || 
|-id=825
| 825 Tanina || 1916 ZL || Tanina, one of the White Russian princesses whose family were slaughtered during the 1918 revolution || 
|-id=826
| 826 Henrika || 1916 ZO || Unknown origin of name || 
|-id=827
| 827 Wolfiana || 1916 ZW || Max Wolf (1863–1932), German astronomer || 
|-id=828
| 828 Lindemannia || 1916 ZX || Adolph Friedrich Lindemann (1846 – 25 August 1931), German-born British amateur astronomer, inventor of the Lindemann electrometer, a quadrant electrometer || 
|-id=829
| 829 Academia || 1916 ZY || The Russian Academy of Sciences, St. Petersburg, on the occasion of its 200th anniversary || 
|-id=830
| 830 Petropolitana || 1916 ZZ || The city of Saint Petersburg, Russia, by its Latin name "Petropolis" || 
|-id=831
| 831 Stateira || 1916 AA || Stateira (died c. 400 BC), wife of Artaxerxes II of Persia || 
|-id=832
| 832 Karin || 1916 AB || Karin Månsdotter (1550–1612), Swedish queen and wife of Eric XIV of Sweden || 
|-id=833
| 833 Monica || 1916 AC || Unknown origin of name || 
|-id=834
| 834 Burnhamia || 1916 AD || Sherburne Wesley Burnham (1838–1921), American astronomer who discovered many visual binary stars. He observed from the Chicago (1877), Lick (1888) and Yerkes (1897) observatories. || 
|-id=835
| 835 Olivia || 1916 AE || Unknown origin of name || 
|-id=836
| 836 Jole || 1916 AF || Iole, wife of divine hero Heracles in Greek mythology || 
|-id=837
| 837 Schwarzschilda || 1916 AG || Karl Schwarzschild (1873–1916), German physicist and astronomer, best known for his solution of Einstein's field equations, leading to the Schwarzschild radius. He was the director of the Göttingen and Potsdam-Babelsberg observatories. || 
|-id=838
| 838 Seraphina || 1916 AH || Unknown origin of name || 
|-id=839
| 839 Valborg || 1916 AJ || Valborg, heroine in the play Axel and Valborg by Danish poet and playwright Adam Oehlenschläger (1779–1850) || 
|-id=840
| 840 Zenobia || 1916 AK || Zenobia (died c. 290 AD), a Slavic Holy Martyr, whose feast day is October 30 in the Eastern Orthodox and Roman Catholic Church. Alternatively, it may refer to Zenobia (c. 240 – c. 274 AD), the queen of the Palmyrene Empire in Syria, who was defeated by Aurelian in 272 AD. || 
|-id=841
| 841 Arabella || 1916 AL || The opera Arabella by German composer Richard Strauss (1864–1949) || 
|-id=842
| 842 Kerstin || 1916 AM || Unknown origin of name. It is a German feminine first name. || 
|-id=843
| 843 Nicolaia || 1916 AN || Thorvald N. Thiele (1838–1910), Danish astronomer, actuary and mathematician. He is the father of the discoverer Holger Thiele. || 
|-id=844
| 844 Leontina || 1916 AP || The town of Lienz, Austria, birthplace of the asteroid's discoverer, Joseph Rheden (1873–1946) || 
|-id=845
| 845 Naëma || 1916 AS || Unknown origin of name || 
|-id=846
| 846 Lipperta || 1916 AT || Eduard Lippert (1844–1925; bio-de), a German businessman and benefactor of the Hamburg Observatory, who to donated the "Lippert Astrograph". || 
|-id=847
| 847 Agnia || 1915 XX || Agnia Ivanovna Bad'ina (1877–1956), a Russian physician from Simeiz, on the Crimean peninsula || 
|-id=848
| 848 Inna || 1915 XS || Nikolaevna Leman-Balanovskaya (1881–1945), a Russian astronomer at the Pulkovo Observatory near St Petersburg || 
|-id=849
| 849 Ara || 1912 NY || American Relief Administration (ARA), in appreciation of the help it gave during the Russian famine of 1922–1923 || 
|-id=850
| 850 Altona || 1916 S24 || Altona, Germany, location of the Altona Observatory at which H. C. Schumacher began publication of the astronomical journal Astronomische Nachrichten in 1821 || 
|-id=851
| 851 Zeissia || 1916 S26 || Zeiss Optical Works || 
|-id=852
| 852 Wladilena || 1916 S27 || Vladimir Lenin (1870–1924), Russian communist revolutionary, politician and Soviet leader || 
|-id=853
| 853 Nansenia || 1916 S28 || Fridtjof Nansen (1861–1930), Norwegian polar explorer || 
|-id=854
| 854 Frostia || 1916 S29 || Edwin Brant Frost (1866–1935), an American astronomer || 
|-id=855
| 855 Newcombia || 1916 ZP || Simon Newcomb (1835–1909), a Canadian–American professor of astronomy and director of the U.S. Nautical Almanac Office at United States Naval Observatory || 
|-id=856
| 856 Backlunda || 1916 S30 || Oskar Backlund (1846–1916), Swedish-Russian astronomer || 
|-id=857
| 857 Glasenappia || 1916 S33 || Sergey Glazenap (1848–1937), a Soviet astronomer, director of both St. Petersburg and Pulkovo Observatory and founder of the Russian Astronomical Society || 
|-id=858
| 858 El Djezaïr || 1916 a || The city of Algiers, Algeria by its Arabian name meaning "the islands". || 
|-id=859
| 859 Bouzaréah || 1916 c || The borough of Bouzaréah, in the city of Algiers, Algeria. It is the site of Algiers Observatory. || 
|-id=860
| 860 Ursina || 1917 BD || Unknown origin of name || 
|-id=861
| 861 Aïda || 1917 BE || Aïda, opera by the Italian composer Giuseppe Verdi (1813–1901) || 
|-id=862
| 862 Franzia || 1917 BF || Franz Wolf, son of the discoverer Max Wolf || 
|-id=863
| 863 Benkoela || 1917 BH || The city of Benkoelen on the island of Sumatra, Indonesia  || 
|-id=864
| 864 Aase || A921 SB || Ase (also spelled "Aase") the mother of the title character in the play Peer Gynt by Norwegian poet Henrik Ibsen (1828–1906) || 
|-id=865
| 865 Zubaida || 1917 BO || Zubaida, a character in the opera Abu Hassan by Carl Maria von Weber (1786–1826) || 
|-id=866
| 866 Fatme || 1917 BQ || Fatme, a character in the opera Abu Hassan by Carl Maria von Weber (1786–1826) || 
|-id=867
| 867 Kovacia || 1917 BS || Friedrich Kovacs (1861–1931), physician from Vienna, Austria, who treated the wife of discoverer Johann Palisa (Src, Src) || 
|-id=868
| 868 Lova || 1917 BU || Unknown origin of name || 
|-id=869
| 869 Mellena || 1917 BV || Werner von Melle (1853–1937), mayor of Hamburg, Germany, who promoted the establishment of the University of Hamburg and founded the Hamburg Observatory || 
|-id=870
| 870 Manto || 1917 BX || Manto, mythological Greek soothsayer, erector of Apollo's oracle in Claros || 
|-id=871
| 871 Amneris || 1917 BY || Amneris, character in Verdi's opera Aida || 
|-id=872
| 872 Holda || 1917 BZ || Edward S. Holden (1846–1914), American astronomer at Lick Observatory and fifth president of the University of California || 
|-id=873
| 873 Mechthild || 1917 CA || Unknown origin of name. (Mechthild of Magdeburg?) A feminine first name in German. || 
|-id=874
| 874 Rotraut || 1917 CC || Likely named after the poem Schön Rotraut (Pretty Rotraut) by German poet Eduard Mörike (1804–1875) || 
|-id=875
| 875 Nymphe || 1917 CF || The Nymphs, Greek mythological figures || 
|-id=876
| 876 Scott || 1917 CH || Miss E. Scott, of the Society of Friends in Vienna, Austria, a friend of discoverer Johann Palisa. This minor planet has also been erroneously attributed to the English polar explorer Robert Falcon Scott || 
|-id=877
| 877 Walküre || 1915 S7 || Valkyrie, a female spirit in Norse mythology. Also, Die Walküre is part of Wagner's opera cycle Der Ring des Nibelungen. || 
|-id=878
| 878 Mildred || 1916 f || Mildred (1915–2016), daughter of American astronomer Harlow Shapley || 
|-id=879
| 879 Ricarda || 1917 CJ || Ricarda Huch (1864–1947), German poet || 
|-id=880
| 880 Herba || 1917 CK || Herba, Greek god of misery and poverty || 
|-id=881
| 881 Athene || 1917 CL || Athena, Greek goddess, also known as Minerva || 
|-id=882
| 882 Swetlana || 1917 CM || Unknown origin of name. A feminine first name in Russian. || 
|-id=883
| 883 Matterania || 1917 CP || August Matter, German maker of photographic plates (Matterplatten) for the Heidelberg Observatory, which allowed Max Wolf and others to make numerous discoveries. This asteroid was one of them. Matter's factory was later destroyed in World War II. || 
|-id=884
| 884 Priamus || 1917 CQ || Priam, from Greek mythology. He is the king of Troy during the Trojan War and father of Hector and Paris in Homer's Iliad. || 
|-id=885
| 885 Ulrike || 1917 CX || Ulrike von Levetzow (1804–1899), a friend and the last love of Johann Wolfgang von Goethe; alternatively: Ulrica, a character in Verdi's opera Un ballo in maschera || 
|-id=886
| 886 Washingtonia || 1917 b || George Washington (1732–1799), American general and first president of the United States of America. || 
|-id=887
| 887 Alinda || 1918 DB || The ancient city of Alinda in Caria, Asia Minor. Alternatively, Alinda is the Man in the Moon in Australian aboriginal mythology. || 
|-id=888
| 888 Parysatis || 1918 DC || Parysatis, wife of Darius II of Persia || 
|-id=889
| 889 Erynia || 1918 DG || The Erinyes, or Furies, Greek mythological creatures || 
|-id=890
| 890 Waltraut || 1918 DK || Waltraut, character in the opera Götterdämmerung in the Der Ring des Nibelungen by Richard Wagner || 
|-id=891
| 891 Gunhild || 1918 DQ || Unknown origin of name. It is a feminine German first name. || 
|-id=892
| 892 Seeligeria || 1918 DR || Hugo von Seeliger (1849–1924), Austrian-German astronomer || 
|-id=893
| 893 Leopoldina || 1918 DS || The German Academy of Sciences Leopoldina || 
|-id=894
| 894 Erda || 1918 DT || Erda, a character in Wagner's opera cycle Der Ring des Nibelungen, who is the goddess of wisdom, fate and Earth. She is based on Urðr (wisdom and fate) and Jörð (the personification of Earth) in Norse mythology. || 
|-id=895
| 895 Helio || 1918 DU || Helium, whose spectrum Paschen and Runge investigated together (Paschen named it at Wolf's request) || 
|-id=896
| 896 Sphinx || 1918 DV || The Sphinx. The female monster in Greek and Egyption mythology has the head of a woman, the haunches of a lion, and the wings of a bird. It has the habit of killing anyone who cannot answer her riddle. || 
|-id=897
| 897 Lysistrata || 1918 DZ || The anti-war comedy Lysistrata by Aristophanes || 
|-id=898
| 898 Hildegard || 1918 EA || Saint Hildegard of Bingen (1098–1179). The Benedictine abbess is considered to be the founder of scientific natural history in Germany. || 
|-id=899
| 899 Jokaste || 1918 EB || Jocasta, mother and wife of Oedipus, the mythical Greek king of Thebes || 
|-id=900
| 900 Rosalinde || 1918 EC || Rosalinde, character in the opera Die Fledermaus by Johann Strauss II (1825–1899) || 
|}

901–1000 

|-
| 901 Brunsia || 1918 EE || Heinrich Bruns (1848–1919), German astronomer and director of the Leipzig Observatory  || 
|-id=902
| 902 Probitas || 1918 EJ || Probity, a quality attributed to the late discoverer || 
|-id=903
| 903 Nealley || 1918 EM || Nealley, amateur astronomer from New York, who contributed to the photographic star charts edition by Max Wolf and Johann Palisa (discoverer) || 
|-id=904
| 904 Rockefellia || 1918 EO || John D. Rockefeller (1839–1937), American business man, philanthropist and one of the wealthiest persons in modern history || 
|-id=905
| 905 Universitas || 1918 ES || University of Hamburg, Germany || 
|-id=906
| 906 Repsolda || 1918 ET || Johann Georg Repsold (1770–1830), German astronomer, optician and manufacturer of astrometric instruments || 
|-id=907
| 907 Rhoda || 1918 EU || Wife of American astronomer Edward Emerson Barnard (1857–1923) || 
|-id=908
| 908 Buda || 1918 EX || Buda, historic part of the city of part of Budapest, Hungary || 
|-id=909
| 909 Ulla || 1919 FA || Ulla Ahrens, member of the Ahrens family, who helped financially at the Heidelberg Observatory. Ulla's father was also a friend of the discoverer, Karl Wilhelm Reinmuth (1892–1979). || 
|-id=910
| 910 Anneliese || 1919 FB || Anneliese, a friend of German astronomer Julius Dick at Babelsberg Observatory, Germany || 
|-id=911
| 911 Agamemnon || 1919 FD || Agamemnon, from Greek mythology. The king of Mycenae commanded the Greek forces in the Trojan War. || 
|-id=912
| 912 Maritima || 1919 FJ || Maritima, annual end-of-term excursions on the North Sea organised by the University of Hamburg; also see . || 
|-id=913
| 913 Otila || 1919 FL || Otila, female name chosen by discoverer Karl Reinmuth from the calendar Der Lahrer hinkende Bote || 
|-id=914
| 914 Palisana || 1919 FN || Johann Palisa (1848–1925), Austrian astronomer, discoverer of minor planets, and friend of the discoverer Max Wolf || 
|-id=915
| 915 Cosette || 1918 b || Cosette, youngest daughter of French astronomer François Gonnessiat (1856–1934), who discovered this asteroid || 
|-id=916
| 916 America || 1915 S1 || America, for the help rendered by the American Relief Administration (under Herbert Hoover) during the famine in Crimea || 
|-id=917
| 917 Lyka || 1915 S4 || Lyka, a friend of the sister of the discoverer, Grigory Neujmin || 
|-id=918
| 918 Itha || 1919 FR || Itha, female name chosen by discoverer Karl Reinmuth from the calendar Der Lahrer hinkende Bote || 
|-id=919
| 919 Ilsebill || 1918 EQ || Ilsebill, a character in the fairy tale The Fisherman and his Wife by the Brothers Grimm || 
|-id=920
| 920 Rogeria || 1919 FT || Rogeria, female name chosen by discoverer Karl Reinmuth from the calendar Der Lahrer hinkende Bote || 
|-id=921
| 921 Jovita || 1919 FV || Jovita, female name chosen by discoverer Karl Reinmuth from the calendar Der Lahrer hinkende Bote || 
|-id=922
| 922 Schlutia || 1919 FW || Edgar Schlubach, a German businessman from Hamburg, and Henry Frederic Tiarks, FRAS, British banker and amateur astronomer from London, who together financed the expedition to the Christmas Island to observe the solar eclipse of September 21, 1922 (Src). || 
|-id=923
| 923 Herluga || 1919 GB || Herluga, female name chosen by discoverer Karl Reinmuth from the calendar Der Lahrer hinkende Bote || 
|-id=924
| 924 Toni || 1919 GC || Toni, female name chosen by discoverer Karl Reinmuth from the calendar Der Lahrer hinkende Bote || 
|-id=925
| 925 Alphonsina || 1920 GM || Alfonso X of Castile (1221–1284) and Alfonso XIII of Spain (1886–1941) || 
|-id=926
| 926 Imhilde || 1920 GN || Imhilde, female name chosen by discoverer Karl Reinmuth from the calendar Der Lahrer hinkende Bote || 
|-id=927
| 927 Ratisbona || 1920 GO || The city of Regensburg in south-east Germany (by its Latin name) || 
|-id=928
| 928 Hildrun || 1920 GP || Hildrun, female name chosen by discoverer Karl Reinmuth from the calendar Der Lahrer hinkende Bote || 
|-id=929
| 929 Algunde || 1920 GR || Algunde, female name chosen by discoverer Karl Reinmuth from the calendar Der Lahrer hinkende Bote || 
|-id=930
| 930 Westphalia || 1920 GS || The historic region of Westphalia in Germany, birthplace of the discoverer Walter Baade (1893–1960) || 
|-id=931
| 931 Whittemora || 1920 GU || Thomas Whittemore (1871–1950), American professor at both Harvard and Columbia Universities || 
|-id=932
| 932 Hooveria || 1920 GV || Herbert Hoover (1874–1964), American president, then secretary of state, in recognition of his help to Austria after World War I || 
|-id=933
| 933 Susi || 1927 CH || Susi, wife of Kasimir Graff (1878–1950), German astronomer at Hamburg Observatory and later director of the Vienna Observatory || 
|-id=934
| 934 Thüringia || 1920 HK || The Thüringia, an Atlantic liner of the Hamburg America Line, on which German astronomer Walter Baade travelled on his visits to New York. the captain was an amateur astronomer, and was invited to name one of Baade's asteroids. || 
|-id=935
| 935 Clivia || 1920 HM || Clivia, genus of flowering plant || 
|-id=936
| 936 Kunigunde || 1920 HN || Kunigunde, female name chosen by discoverer Karl Reinmuth from the calendar Der Lahrer hinkende Bote || 
|-id=937
| 937 Bethgea || 1920 HO || Hans Bethge (1876–1946), German poet || 
|-id=938
| 938 Chlosinde || 1920 HQ || Chlosinde, female name chosen by discoverer Karl Reinmuth from the calendar Der Lahrer hinkende Bote || 
|-id=939
| 939 Isberga || 1920 HR || Isberga, female name chosen by discoverer Karl Reinmuth from the calendar Der Lahrer hinkende Bote || 
|-id=940
| 940 Kordula || 1920 HT || Kordula, female name chosen by discoverer Karl Reinmuth from the calendar Der Lahrer hinkende Bote || 
|-id=941
| 941 Murray || 1920 HV || Gilbert Murray (1866–1957), British classical scholar and diplomat who helped Austria in 1920 through the League of Nations || 
|-id=942
| 942 Romilda || 1920 HW || Romilda, female name chosen by discoverer Karl Reinmuth from the calendar Der Lahrer hinkende Bote || 
|-id=943
| 943 Begonia || 1920 HX || Begonia, genus of herbs and flowers || 
|-id=944
| 944 Hidalgo || 1920 HZ || Miguel Hidalgo (1753–1811), father of the independence of Mexico, where German astronomers went to observe the solar eclipse of September 10, 1923 || 
|-id=945
| 945 Barcelona || 1921 JB || Barcelona, Spain, where the discoverer was born and the asteroid discovered || 
|-id=946
| 946 Poësia || 1921 JC || Poësia, goddess of poetry || 
|-id=947
| 947 Monterosa || 1921 JD || The MV Monte Rosa, a ship (of the German Monte Klasse) used by the University of Hamburg on their outings on the North Sea; also see . || 
|-id=948
| 948 Jucunda || 1921 JE || Jucunda, female name chosen by discoverer Karl Reinmuth from the calendar Der Lahrer hinkende Bote || 
|-id=949
| 949 Hel || 1921 JK || Hel, Norse goddess || 
|-id=950
| 950 Ahrensa || 1921 JP || The Ahrens family, friends of the discoverer, Karl Reinmuth || 
|-id=951
| 951 Gaspra || 1916 S45 || The spa town of Gaspra on the Crimean peninsula || 
|-id=952
| 952 Caia || 1916 S61 || Caia, a character in the novel Quo Vadis by Henryk Sienkiewicz || 
|-id=953
| 953 Painleva || 1921 JT || Paul Painlevé (1863–1933), French mathematician and politician || 
|-id=954
| 954 Li || 1921 JU || Lina Alstede Reinmuth, wife of discoverer Karl Reinmuth || 
|-id=955
| 955 Alstede || 1921 JV || Lina Alstede Reinmuth, wife of discoverer Karl Reinmuth || 
|-id=956
| 956 Elisa || 1921 JW || Elisa Reinmuth, mother of discoverer Karl Reinmuth || 
|-id=957
| 957 Camelia || 1921 JX || Camellia, genus of flowering plants || 
|-id=958
| 958 Asplinda || 1921 KC || Bror Ansgar Asplind (1890–1954), Swedish astronomer || 
|-id=959
| 959 Arne || 1921 KF || Arne Asplind, son of Swedish astronomer Bror Asplind, also see (958) || 
|-id=960
| 960 Birgit || 1921 KH || Birgit Asplind, daughter of Swedish astronomer Bror Asplind, also see (958) || 
|-id=961
| 961 Gunnie || 1921 KM || Gunnie Asplind, daughter of Swedish astronomer Bror Asplind, also see (958) || 
|-id=962
| 962 Aslög || 1921 KP || Aslög, mythological Norse woman || 
|-id=963
| 963 Iduberga || 1921 KR || Iduberga, female name chosen by discoverer Karl Reinmuth from the calendar Der Lahrer hinkende Bote || 
|-id=964
| 964 Subamara || 1921 KS || Latin for 'very bitter' (referring to the observing conditions at the Vienna Observatory) || 
|-id=965
| 965 Angelica || 1921 KT || Angelica Hartmann, wife of the discoverer, Johannes Franz Hartmann (1865–1936) || 
|-id=966
| 966 Muschi || 1921 KU || "Kitty"  nickname of Walter Baade'S wife, who discovered this asteroid || 
|-id=967
| 967 Helionape || 1921 KV || Adolf von Sonnenthal (1834–1909), an Austrian actor . Helionape is the direct Greek translation of his name ("Sonne" and "Tal", to "helio" and "nape"). || 
|-id=968
| 968 Petunia || 1921 KW || Petunia, a genus of flowering plants || 
|-id=969
| 969 Leocadia || 1921 KZ || Unknown origin of name. Feminine Russian first name. || 
|-id=970
| 970 Primula || 1921 LB || The flower genus Primula (primroses) || 
|-id=971
| 971 Alsatia || 1921 LF || Alsace, region in western France. Originally named "Alsace" by French discoverer Alexandre Schaumasse (1882–1958), in 1920, the name was later changed to "Alsatia" by the German ARI. || 
|-id=972
| 972 Cohnia || 1922 LK || Fritz Cohn (1866–1922), German astronomer and director of the Astronomisches Rechen-Institut in Berlin || 
|-id=973
| 973 Aralia || 1922 LR || Aralia, genus of ivy-like plant || 
|-id=974
| 974 Lioba || 1922 LS || Saint Leoba (or Lioba; c. 710–782), abbess in Tauberbischofsheim, Germany, who helped Saint Boniface spreading Christianity throughout Germany. || 
|-id=975
| 975 Perseverantia || 1922 LT || Perseverance || 
|-id=976
| 976 Benjamina || 1922 LU || Benjamin, son of discoverer Benjamin Jekhowsky || 
|-id=977
| 977 Philippa || 1922 LV || Baron Philippe de Rothschild (1902–1988), French financier || 
|-id=978
| 978 Aidamina || 1922 LY || Aida Minaievna, a friend of the family of Soviet discoverer Sergey Belyavsky || 
|-id=979
| 979 Ilsewa || 1922 MC || Ilse Waldorf, an acquaintance of German discoverer Karl Reinmuth || 
|-id=980
| 980 Anacostia || 1921 W19 || The historic district of Anacostia in Washington, D.C., United States, as well as for the nearby Anacostia River || 
|-id=981
| 981 Martina || 1917 S92 || Henri Martin (1810–1883), French historian and politician || 
|-id=982
| 982 Franklina || 1922 MD || John Franklin Adams (1843–1912), British amateur astronomer and stellar cartographer || 
|-id=983
| 983 Gunila || 1922 ME || Gunila, female name chosen by discoverer Karl Reinmuth from the calendar Der Lahrer hinkende Bote || 
|-id=984
| 984 Gretia || 1922 MH || Gretia, sister-in-law of German astronomer Albrecht Kahrstedt (1897–1971), also see  || 
|-id=985
| 985 Rosina || 1922 MO || Rosina, female name chosen by discoverer Karl Reinmuth from the calendar Der Lahrer hinkende Bote || 
|-id=986
| 986 Amelia || 1922 MQ || Amelia, wife of discoverer Josep Comas i Solà || 
|-id=987
| 987 Wallia || 1922 MR || Wallia, female name chosen by discoverer Karl Reinmuth from the calendar Der Lahrer hinkende Bote || 
|-id=988
| 988 Appella || 1922 MT || Paul Émile Appell (1855–1930), French astronomer || 
|-id=989
| 989 Schwassmannia || 1922 MW || Arnold Schwassmann (1870–1964), German astronomer, discoverer of minor planets and comets at Potsdam-Babelsberg and Hamburg-Bergedorf observatories || 
|-id=990
| 990 Yerkes || 1922 MZ || Yerkes Observatory, in Williams Bay, Wisconsin, United States, where this asteroid was discovered || 
|-id=991
| 991 McDonalda || 1922 NB || McDonald Observatory, Texas, United States, originally endowed by the Texas banker William Johnson McDonald || 
|-id=992
| 992 Swasey || 1922 ND || Ambrose Swasey (1846–1937), American benefactor and mechanical engineer, co-founder, with Worcester Reed Warner of the Warner & Swasey Company which manufactured astronomical telescopes and precision instruments, including the 82-inch Otto Struve Telescope for the McDonald Observatory, one of the largest telescopes at the time. They gave their own observatory to Case Western University and it took the name Warner and Swasey Observatory. || 
|-id=993
| 993 Moultona || 1923 NJ || Forest Ray Moulton (1872–1952), American astronomer and mathematician || 
|-id=994
| 994 Otthild || 1923 NL || Otthild, female name chosen by discoverer Karl Reinmuth from the calendar Der Lahrer hinkende Bote || 
|-id=995
| 995 Sternberga || 1923 NP || Pavel Shternberg (1865–1920), Russian astronomer || 
|-id=996
| 996 Hilaritas || 1923 NM || Contentedness || 
|-id=997
| 997 Priska || 1923 NR || Priska, female name chosen by discoverer Karl Reinmuth from the calendar Der Lahrer hinkende Bote || 
|-id=998
| 998 Bodea || 1923 NU || Johann Elert Bode (1747–1826), German astronomer, author of the Berliner Astronomisches Jahrbuch, known for the empirical Titius–Bode law about the sequence of planetary distances || 
|-id=999
| 999 Zachia || 1923 NW || Franz Xaver von Zach (1754–1832), Hungarian astronomer and director of the Seeberg Observatory  in Germany || 
|-id=000
|}

References 

000001-001000